= Earthquake simulation =

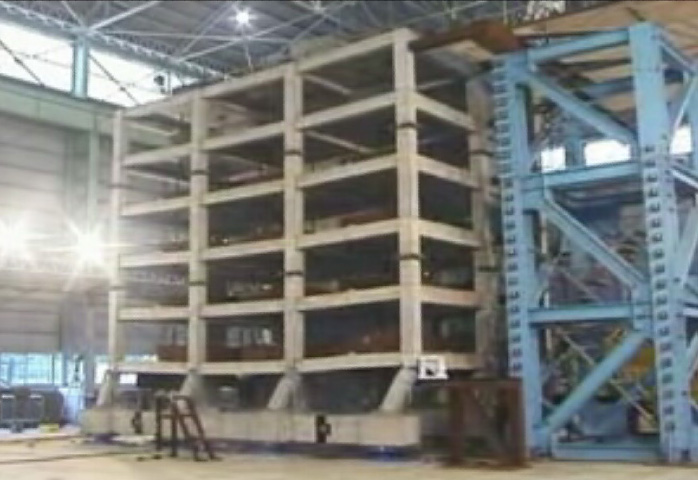
Shake-table destructive testing of a model non-ductile 6-storey building

Earthquake simulation applies a real or simulated vibrational input to a structure that possesses the essential features of a real seismic event. Earthquake simulations are generally performed to study the effects of earthquakes on man-made engineered structures, or on natural features which may present a hazard during an earthquake.

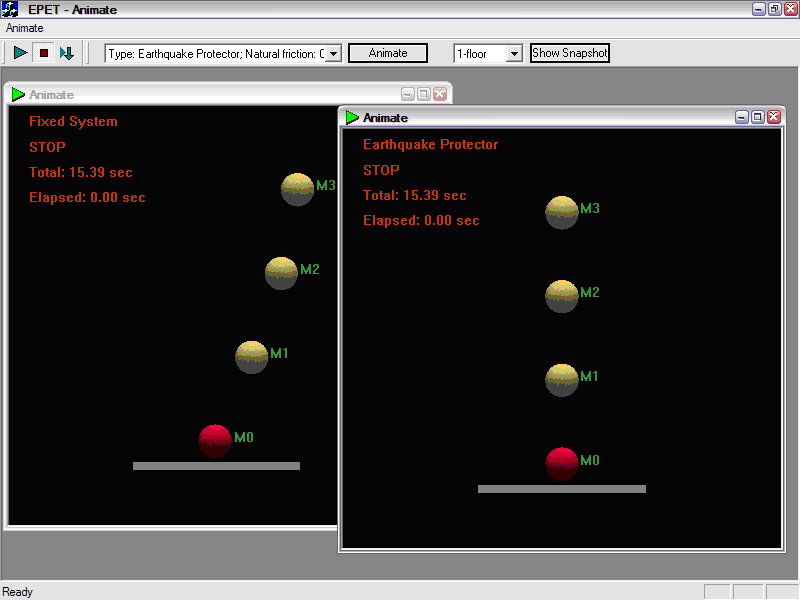
PrintScreen images of concurrent computer models animation

Dynamic experiments on building and non-building structures may be physical – as with shake-table testing – or virtual (based on computer simulation). In all cases, to verify a structure's expected seismic performance, researchers prefer to deal with so called 'real time-histories' though the last cannot be 'real' for a hypothetical earthquake specified by either a building code or by some particular research requirements.

== Shake-table testing ==
Studying a building's response to an earthquake is performed by putting a model of the structure on a shake-table that simulates the seismic loading. The earliest such experiments were performed more than a century ago.

== Computational approaches ==
Another way is to evaluate the earthquake performance analytically. The very first earthquake simulations were performed by statically applying some horizontal inertia forces, based on scaled peak ground accelerations, to a mathematical model of a building. With the further development of computational technologies, static approaches began to give way to dynamic ones.

Traditionally, numerical simulation and physical tests have been uncoupled and performed separately. So-called hybrid testing systems employ rapid, parallel analyses using both physical and computational tests.

== See also ==
- Seismic analysis
