= National Center for Research on Earthquake Engineering =

Research center in Da'an, Taipei, Taiwan

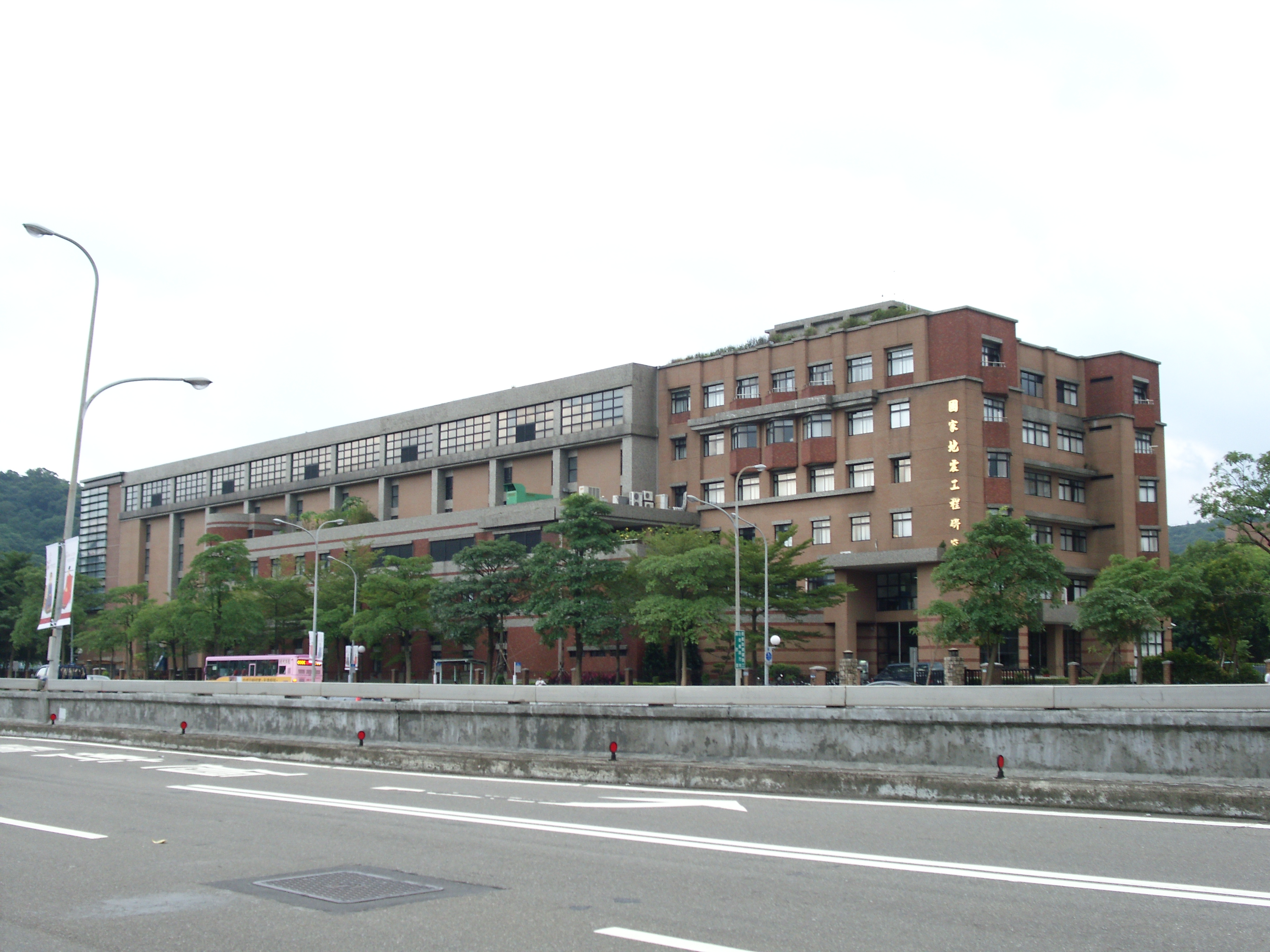
- Other name: 國家地震工程研究中心
- Established: 1980
- Director-General: Yu-Chen Ou (歐昱辰)
- Location: Da'an, Taipei, Taiwan
- Coordinates: 25°01′01.8″N 121°32′52.5″E
- Interactive map of National Center for Research on Earthquake Engineering
- Website: www.ncree.niar.org.tw

National Center for Research on Earthquake Engineering (NCREE; traditional Chinese: 國家地震工程研究中心; simplified Chinese: 国家地震工程研究中心; pinyin: Guójiā Dìzhèn Gōngchéng Yánjiū Zhōngxīn) is an organisation in Da'an District, Taipei, Taiwan.

NCREE was established in 1980 by the National Science Council (NSC), and they are working together with the National Taiwan University (NTU), as well as being part of the National Applied Research Laboratories, whose purpose to improve efficiency between research institutions, and they are trying to decrease the impact of earthquakes on various structures.

== Organizational structures ==
- Building Engineering Division
- Bridge Engineering Division
- Earth Sciences and Geotechnical Engineering Division
- Nonstructural Components and Systems Division
- Structural Monitoring and Control Division
- Earthquake Disaster Simulation Division
- Taipei Experimental Technology Division
- Tainan Experimental Technology Division
- Information Management Division
- Administration Division
- Planning and Dissemination Division

== Aims ==
NCREE is aiming to improve seismic resistant designs for all constructions and to provide feedback to the engineering community through research and development. The center was built for researchers to collaborate and check their theories by doing various experiments. Their goals are:

- Establish and provide research facilities.

- Develop and improve the seismic engineering database.

- Create and carry out regulations relating to seismic design codes.

- Co-ordinate and Integrate academic institutes and related industries.

- Introduce, Develop and Educate on seismic-resisting technology.

== Facilities ==
NCREE's seismic simulation laboratory has international standard facilities, such as eighteen sets of static hydraulic actuators and six sets of dynamic hydraulic actuators.

=== Seismic Simulation Shaking Table ===
Shaking Table

The Tri-Axial Seismic Simulator, or Shaking Table, can produce earthquake ground motions in six degrees of freedom, with motion in 3 axes.

The shaking table is 5m x 5m and has a mass of 27 tons. It can take models of large scale buildings weighing up to 50 tons, and the square shape of the table provides large bending and torsional stiffness.

Small-scale or full-scale models are placed on the shaking table. To prevent the instrument vibration on surrounding areas during experiments, the shaking table has a vibration isolation system, including 80 dampers, 96 airbags and air springs, and a reaction mass (16m x 16m x 7.6m, weighing about four thousand tons.)

Under the table are twelve actuators, which produce the shaking movement in six degrees of freedom. There are four actuators for each axis, and the hydraulic power is provided by two electrical pumps and three diesel pumps. The weight of the shaky table and the model is balanced by four static supports.

By doing these experiments, engineers can understand a structure's response to an earthquake. The results will show how stable the building is during earthquakes, and it will also accelerate the development of seismic isolation and minimize the damage caused by an earthquake.

=== Reaction Wall and Strong Floor ===
The Reaction Wall and Strong floor make it possible to test multiple full-scale structural experiments. The wall can be used to perform seismic tests by using experimental methods, such as traditional quasi-static tests, cyclic loading tests and pseudo-dynamic tests.

The wall is L-shaped and has 4 sections: 15m x 15.5m, 12m x 15.5m, 9m x 12m and 6m x 12m. The strong floor is a reinforced block of concrete 60m x 29m x 1.2m. The compressive strength of the concrete for both the reaction wall and the strong floor is 350 kg/cm2

During experiments, full-scale and large-scale constructions are mounted onto the strong floor. Hydraulic actuators then exert forces on the test objects, making it possible to see the resistance of various structures and performances of seismic isolators and energy dissipaters. The experimental data has helped proved that seismic theories can be applied, and are a reference to earthquake resistant building designs.

== Research activities ==
Building Engineering Studies

- Seismic evaluation and retrofit technologies of existing buildings.

- Development of advanced innovative construction.

- Revision of building seismic design codes.

Bridge Engineering Studies

- performance-based design of bearing systs in bridges.

- Seismic evaluation and retrofit technologies of existing bridges.

Structural Control and System Identification Studies

- Studies on structural health monitoring and structural control.

- Seismic evaluation and retrofit technologies for high-tech industrial structures.

Geotechnical and Strong Ground Motion Studies

- Studies on earthquake prediction models.

- Establishment of Engineering Geological Databases for TSMIP (EGDT). TSMIP stands for Taiwan Strong Motion Instrumentation Program.

- Seismic behaviour of the investigation of soils in the large bi-axial shaking table shear box.

Earthquake Scenario Studies

- Establishment and application of geotechnical earth science hazard database.

- Development of Taiwan seismic scenario database and its applications.

- Development of Taiwan Earthquake Loss Estimation System.

Experimental Technology Studies

- Collaborative experiment technology using the Internet.

- Application of optical fiber sensors in civil engineering structures.

Information Technology Studies

- Establishment of an earthquake engineering database.

- Integration of numerical and experimental stimulation.

== Educating ==
IDEERS 2007

To educate people about earthquakes, there are published books, printed reports, international seminars and videos. NCREE also holds IDEERS and ITP to raise public awareness.

=== IDEERS ===
IDEERS stands for "Introducing and Demonstrating Earthquake Engineering Research in Schools" and is held every year by the British council in Taipei, NCREE and the Bristol University. It is a science-based project with a competition developed by the Earthquake Engineering Research Centre of the Bristol University. The students participating are undergraduate students majoring in civil engineering related subjects and high school students. Students entering the competition will make their models using cheap materials which then will be put on the tri-axial seismic simulator (shaking-table). Models will be shaken to destruction, and the best-designed models will win prizes.

=== ITP ===
ITP stands for The International Training Program (for Seismic Design of Structures and Hazard Mitigation) and is held by The National Science Council (NSC) and the Democratic Pacific Union. It is a short-term workshop to train government officials and engineers from different countries (In 2006, thirty-three people attended from fourteen countries). The Program will try to improve the disaster-preventing technology and the earthquake-resisting ability of those countries and try reduce the impacts and losses caused by major earthquakes.

== List of Director and Former Director ==
1. Ou Yu-Chen (2024-now)
2. Chou Chung-Che (2021-2024)
3. Hwang Shyn-Jian (2017-2021)
4. Chang Kuo-Chun (2010-2017)
5. Tsai Keh-Chyuan (2003-2010)
6. Loh Chin-Hsiung (1997-2003)
7. Yeh Chau-Shioung (1990-1997)

== See also ==
- List of earthquakes in Taiwan
- Earthquake Engineering Research Institute
- International Institute of Earthquake Engineering and Seismology
