= List of international earthquake acceleration coefficients =

Earthquake acceleration coefficients are used in structural design for earthquake engineering around the world. For example, a coefficient of 0.09 indicates that a building is designed that 0.09457 of its weight can be applied horizontally during an earthquake.

== Australia ==
From Australian Standard 1170.4. Coefficients are based on 10% chance exceedence in 50 years.

- Adelaide - 0.10
- Brisbane - 0.06
- Hobart - 0.05
- Melbourne - 0.08
- Perth - 0.09
- Sydney - 0.08

Meckering, Western Australia, has the largest coefficient in Australia of 0.22.

== Canada ==
Canada uses spectral acceleration.

== Greece ==
From ΕAΚ 2003 building code

- Zone 1 = 0.16g (Thrace and most of Northern Greece, Parts of Athens and Parts of Thessaloniki)
- Zone 2 = 0.24g (Parts of Athens and Parts of Thessaloniki)
- Zone 3 = 0.36g (Zakynthos Island, Cephalonia Island)

== United States ==
Earthquake acceleration coefficients are calculated from the Seismic Ground Motion maps in Chapter 22 of ASCE 7, which are generally adopted in states and municipalities through the International Building Code. Coefficients can be found in the ASCE Hazard Tool online.
