= Bahram Akasheh =

Iranian geophysicist and seismologist (1936–2025)

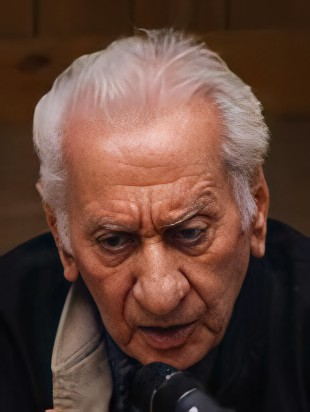
Bahram Akasheh

Bahram Akasheh (Persian: بهرام عکاشه; 1936 – 2 June 2025) was an Iranian geophysicist and seismologist and Professor of Geophysics at University of Tehran. He was considered one of Iran's leading experts on earthquakes and seismic activity.

Akasheh encouraged scientific research and study into earthquakes in Iran, as well as possible mitigation measures as a response. He was a strong advocate of urban development which is coordinated with the tight regulations imposed in the 1989 seismic code in Iran by the International Institute of Earthquake Engineering and Seismology. He also expressed a disagreement and disapproval with the notion in Iran that natural disasters are God-given and stressed the importance of science and technology and the extent to which the effects of a potential disaster can be curbed. According to Akasheh:

Earthquake education is very poor in Iran. Most people think that whatever God wills, will happen. This is absolutely wrong. This thinking is poisonous.

Akasheh was one of the foremost proponents for moving the Iranian capital of Tehran to Isfahan because of a distinct threat from a devastating earthquake. According to Akasheh's calculations, there is a 90 percent chance of a 6.0-magnitude quake hitting the capital and a 50 percent chance of 7.5-magnitude earthquake. The vast majority of buildings in Tehran are located on the convergence of some 100 known fault lines which in their present architectural form are incapable of withstanding even a moderate earthquake. A hypothesis presented by Akasheh indicates that a 6.8 quake in Tehran would kill more than 700,000 people. According to Akasheh, "Tehran must be rebuilt; if not it should be moved. Either we have to put up with millions of dead, millions of injured, or we need to move the capital somewhere else and take steps to decrease the population here and make Tehran more resistant to earthquakes." Following the serious damage caused by the 2003 Bam earthquake, Akasheh wrote to the President of Iran, Mohammed Khatami, in 2004 requesting a move of the capital to Isfahan which had been the nation's main centre during the Persian Empire.

He was dean of Engineering faculty of Islamic Azad University North Tehran Branch. He had also once been head of geophysics department of this university from 1994.

Akasheh died on 2 June 2025, at the age of 89.
