= Metallic roller bearing =

In earthquake engineering, a metallic roller bearing is a base isolation device which is intended for protection of various building and non-building structures against potentially damaging lateral impacts of strong earthquakes. This bearing support may be adapted, with certain precautions, as a seismic isolator to skyscrapers and buildings on soft ground. Metallic roller bearings are employed by a housing complex (17 stories) in Tokyo, Japan.

== See also ==
- Earthquake-resistant structures
- Elevated building foundation
