= International Institute of Earthquake Engineering and Seismology =

Iranian research institute

International Institute of Earthquake Engineering and Seismology (IIEES) (Persian: پژوهشگاه بین‌المللی زلزله‌شناسی و مهندسی زلزله) is an international earthquake engineering and seismology institute based in Iran. It was established as a result of the 24th UNESCO General Conference Resolution DR/250 under Iranian government approval in 1989. It was founded as an independent institute within the Iran's Ministry of Science, Research and Technology.

On its establishment, the IIEES drew up a seismic code in an attempt to improve the infrastructural response to earthquakes and seismic activity in the country. Its primary objective is to reduce the risk of seismic activity on buildings and roads and provide mitigation measures both in Iran and the region.

The institute is responsible for research and education in this field along with several universities and institutes in Iran by conducting research and providing education and knowledge in seismotectonic studies, seismology and earthquake engineering. In addition conducts research and educates in risk management and generating possibilities for an effective earthquake response strategy.

The IIEES is composed of the following research Centers: Seismology, Geotechnical Earthquake Engineering, Structural Earthquake Engineering, Risk Management; National center for Earthquake Prediction, and Graduate School, Public Education and Information Division.

== See also ==
- 2003 Bam earthquake
- Bahram Akasheh
- Earthquake Engineering Research Institute
- National Center for Research on Earthquake Engineering
