= Earthquake shaking table =

Technique to test seismic performance of objects

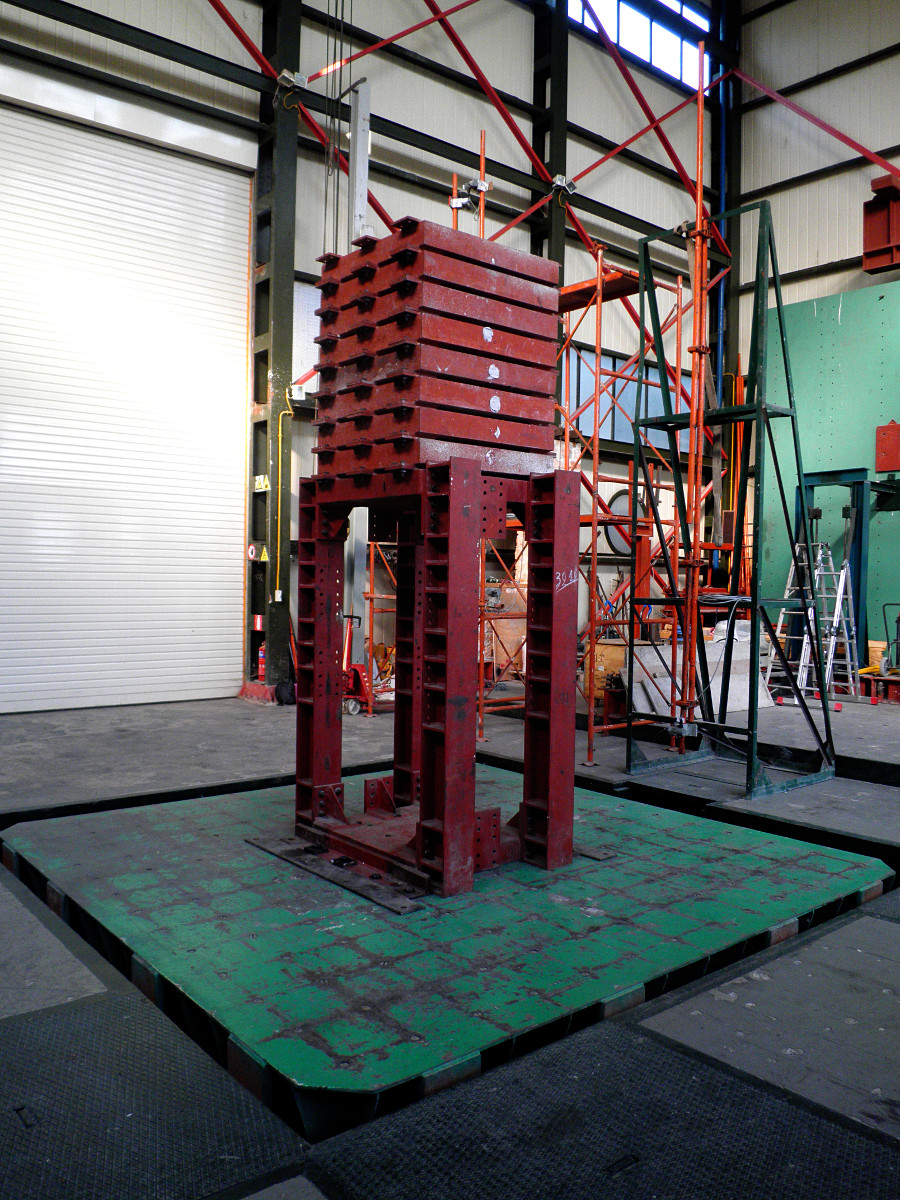
Earthquake shaking table at the National Technical University, Athens, Greece

There are different experimental techniques which can be used to test the response of structures and soil or rock slopes to verify their seismic performance. One of these is using an earthquake shaking table (a shaking table or shake table). This device is used for shaking scaled slopes, structural models or building components with a wide range of simulated ground motions, including reproductions of recorded earthquake time-histories.

While modern tables typically consist of a rectangular platform that is driven in up to six degrees of freedom (DOF) by servo-hydraulic or other types of actuators, the earliest shake table, invented at the University of Tokyo in 1893 to categorize types of building construction, ran on a simple wheel mechanism. Test specimens are fixed to the platform and shaken, often to the point of failure. Using video records and data from transducers, it is possible to interpret the dynamic behaviour of the specimen. Earthquake shaking tables are used extensively in seismic research, as they provide the means to excite structures such that they are subjected to conditions representative of true earthquake ground motions.

They are also used in other fields of engineering to test and qualify vehicles and components of vehicles that must respect heavy vibration requirements and standards. Some applications include testing according to aerospace, electrical, and military standards. Earthquake shaking tables are essential in model testing contests, where participants evaluate designs developed within specific guidelines against simulated seismic activity. Simple shake tables are also used in architecture and structural engineering primarily for educational purposes, helping students learn how structures respond to earthquakes through hands-on model testing.

== See also ==
- Earthquake engineering
