= Probable maximum loss =

Probable maximum loss (PML) is a term used in the insurance industry. The calculation of probable maximum loss is an important part of the underwriting decision to accept or reject a risk and how much risk to retain net of reinsurance.

The definition is not consistent across the insurance industry. Probable maximum loss can be defined as the largest possible loss estimated might occur in respect of a particular risk under particular circumstances. Other calculations distinguish it from maximum foreseeable loss (MFL) by assuming some mitigation from protective measures in PML and complete failure of protective measures in MFL.

== Use in Different Product Lines ==
In fire insurance, probable maximum loss is the maximum loss that could occur due in the presence of failure of one or more protective systems such as sprinkler systems, fire alarms, water supply, or fire department response.

In insurance of structures affected by seismic activity, probable maximum loss is covered by ASTM E2026. That standard aimed to “standardize” the nomenclature for seismic loss estimation, as well as establish some guidelines as to the level of review and qualifications of the reviewer. Engineering studies on existing buildings originally only addressed the potential risk to life-safety (i.e. collapse) as the buildings were compared to current building code requirements. However, due to the need for understanding the potential losses associated with a building, crude loss estimation techniques were developed in the 1970s. Additional methods for estimating seismic losses were developed in the 1980s (ATC-13) and continue to be developed and refined today. The document was updated in 2016 and now recommends the discontinued use of PML, and the use of new nomenclature: Scenario Expected Loss (SEL), Scenario Upper Loss (SUL), and Probable Loss (PL).
