= Moment-resisting frame =

Moment-resisting frame is a rectilinear assemblage of beams and columns, with the beams rigidly connected to the columns.

Resistance to lateral forces is provided primarily by rigid frame action – that is, by the development of bending moment and shear force in the frame members and joints. By virtue of the rigid beam–column connections, a moment frame cannot displace laterally without bending the beams or columns depending on the geometry of the connection. The bending rigidity and strength of the frame members is therefore the primary source of lateral stiffness and strength for the entire frame.

The 1994 Northridge earthquake revealed a common flaw in steel-frame construction — poorly welded moment connections — and building codes were revised to strengthen them.

== Early history ==
Steel moment-resisting frames have been in use for more than one hundred years, dating to the earliest use of structural steel in building construction. Steel building construction with the frame carrying the vertical loads initiated with the Home Insurance Building in Chicago, a 10-story structure constructed in 1884 with a height of 138 ft, often credited with being the first skyscraper. This and other tall buildings in Chicago spawned an entire generation of tall buildings, constructed with load bearing steel frames supporting concrete floors and non-load bearing, unreinforced masonry infill walls at their perimeters. Framing in these early structures typically utilized "H" shapes built up from plates, and "L" and "Z" sections.
