= Dissipator (building design) =

A dissipator is a device mounted among some sections of a building to reduce strains during an earthquake by slowing down the shaking of the building. During an earthquake, the sections of the building are subjected to movements which are relative to each other (for instance, the relative movement between two different floors). When the structures oscillate, the dissipator devices, some of which are similar to pistons, slow down the vibration by dissipating viscous or friction energy, thus increasing the equivalent viscous coefficient and then reducing the strains on the structure itself.
