= Destructive testing =

Test involving a specimen's destruction

In destructive testing (or destructive physical analysis, DPA) tests are carried out to the specimen's failure, in order to understand a specimen's performance or material behavior under different loads. These tests are generally much easier to carry out, yield more information, and are easier to interpret than nondestructive testing.

== Applications ==
Destructive testing is most suitable, and economic, for objects which will be mass-produced, as the cost of destroying a small number of specimens is negligible. It is usually not economical to do destructive testing where only one or very few items are to be produced (for example, in the case of a building).

== Analyzing and documenting destructive failure mode ==
Analyzing and documenting the destructive failure mode is often accomplished using a high-speed camera recording continuously (movie-loop) until the failure is detected. Detecting the failure can be accomplished using a sound detector or stress gauge which produces a signal to trigger the high-speed camera. These high-speed cameras have advanced recording modes to capture almost any type of destructive failure. After the failure the high-speed camera will stop recording. The captured images can be played back in slow motion showing precisely what happens before, during and after the destructive event, image by image.

== Methods and techniques ==
=== Testing of large structures ===
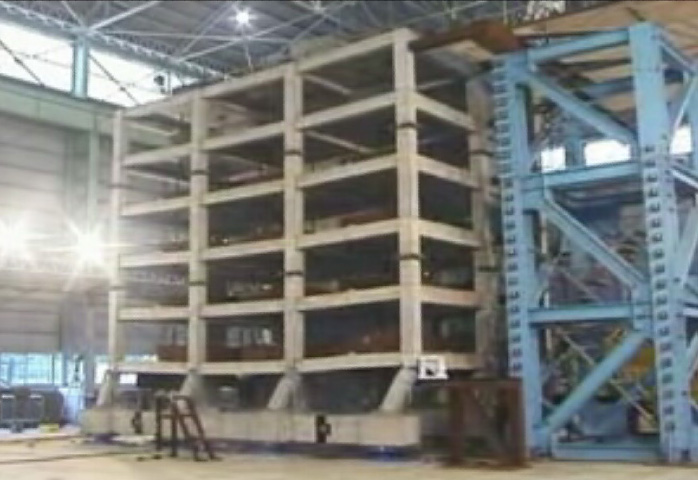
Snapshot from shake-table video of a 6-story non-ductile concrete building

Building structures or large nonbuilding structures (such as dams and bridges) are rarely subjected to destructive testing due to the prohibitive cost of constructing a building, or a scale model of a building, just to destroy it.

Earthquake engineering requires a good understanding of how structures will perform at earthquakes. Destructive tests are more frequently carried out for structures which are to be constructed in earthquake zones. Such tests are sometimes referred to as crash tests, and they are carried out to verify the designed seismic performance of a new building, or the actual performance of an existing building. The tests are, mostly, carried out on a platform called a shake-table which is designed to shake in the same manner as an earthquake. Results of those tests often include the corresponding shake-table videos.

Testing of structures in earthquakes is increasingly done by modelling the structure using specialist finite element software.

=== Software testing ===
Destructive software testing is a type of software testing which attempts to cause a piece of software to fail in an uncontrolled manner, in order to test its robustness and to help establish range limits, within which the software will operate in a stable and reliable manner.

== Automotive testing ==
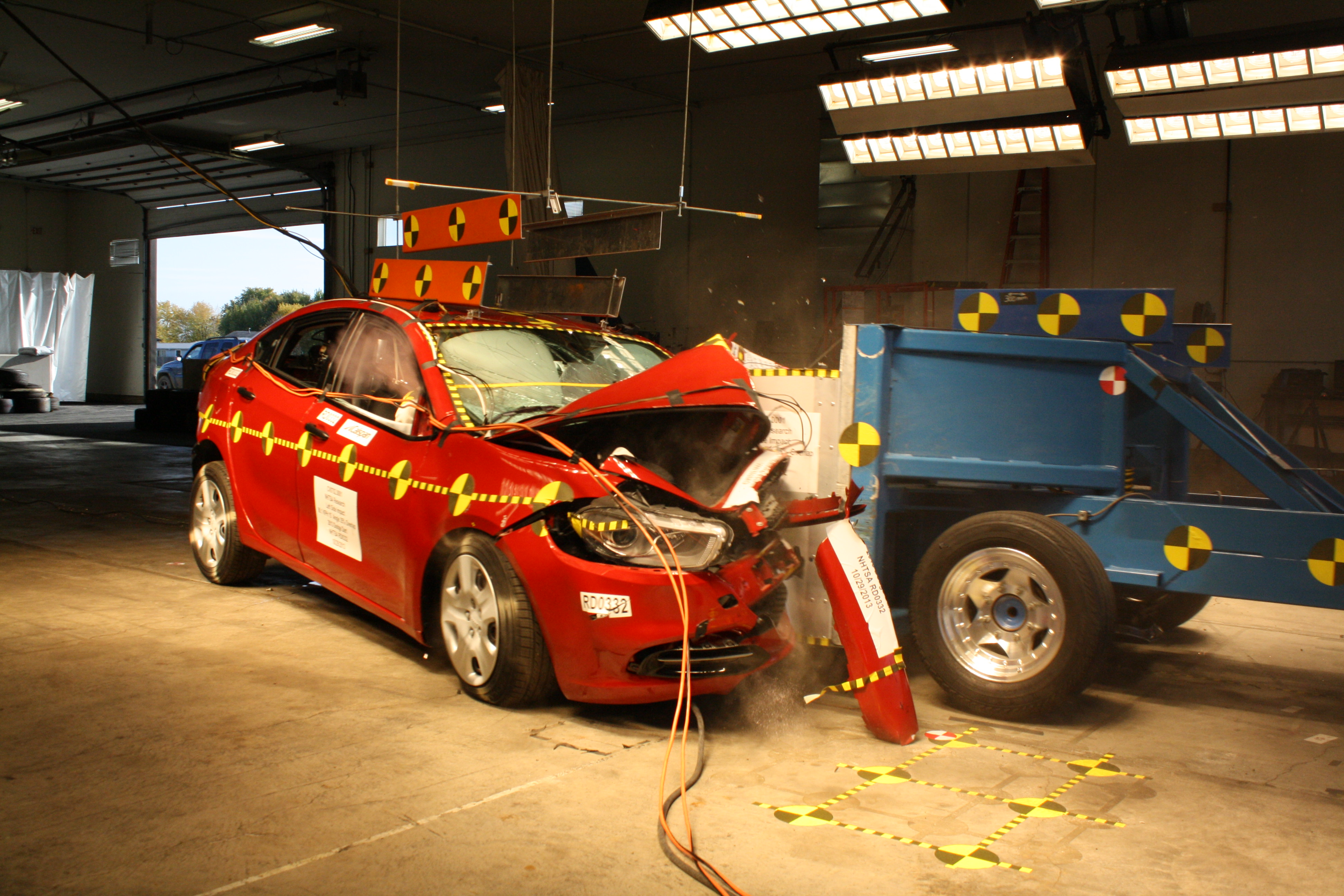
Oblique frontal crash test of a Dodge Dart

Automobiles are subject to crash testing by both automobile manufacturers and a variety of agencies. Individual manufacturers also carry out sample testing to verify non destructive line side tests, usually by means of ultrasonic inspection.

== Aircraft testing ==
There has also been extensive destructive testing of passenger and military aircraft, conducted by aircraft manufacturers and organizations like NASA. The 2012 Boeing 727 crash experiment was conducted and filmed by the Discovery channel. It is now standard procedure to test to destruction the first few production models of new airplanes by loading various components until they fail. The 1951 movie, No Highway in the Sky starring James Stewart and Marlene Dietrich told the story of an eccentric engineer who pioneered research into destructive testing of complete components against a great deal of skepticism.

== Material testing and process ==
After a material is formed, various processes can be used to measure its strength, dexterity, durability, and other important properties. Some of these testing methods are commonly used in engineering to determine whether a material is suitable for a project or if an alternative needs to be considered.

Material testing can involve stretching and pulling a sample to assess its elasticity, and how well it retains its shape after being deformed. This helps determine whether the material can return to its original form before sustaining major damage. Additionally, these tests evaluate how well a material withstands rigorous conditions before breaking, providing insights into its overall strength and hardness.

Material testing can also involve using electricity to evaluate different metal types for conductivity, overheating resistance, and durability under electrical strain. This information is crucial for determining which materials are suitable for electrical poles and systems, ensuring both efficiency and worker safety.

== See also ==
- Crash test
- Hardness tests
- Median lethal dose
- Metallographic test
- Nondestructive testing
- Reproducibility
- Show and Display
- Stress tests
- Testability
