= Seismic loading =

Seismic loading is one of the basic concepts of earthquake engineering which means application of an earthquake-generated agitation to a structure. It happens at contact surfaces of a structure either with the ground, or with adjacent structures, or with gravity waves from tsunami.

Seismic loading depends, primarily, on:

- Anticipated earthquake's parameters at the site – known as seismic hazard
- Geotechnical parameters of the site
- Structure's parameters
- Characteristics of the anticipated gravity waves from tsunami (if applicable).

Sometimes, seismic load exceeds ability of a structure to resist it without being broken, partially or completely Due to their mutual interaction, seismic loading and seismic performance of a structure are intimately related.

== See also ==
- Earthquake engineering structures
