= Diaphragm (structural system) =

Element in structural engineering

In structural engineering, a diaphragm is a structural element that transmits lateral loads to the vertical resisting elements of a structure (such as shear walls or frames). Diaphragms are typically horizontal but can be sloped in a gable roof on a wood structure or concrete ramp in a parking garage. The diaphragm forces tend to be transferred to the vertical resisting elements primarily through in-plane shear stress. The most common lateral loads to be resisted are those resulting from wind and earthquake actions, but other lateral loads such as lateral earth pressure or hydrostatic pressure can also be resisted by diaphragm action.

The diaphragm of a structure often does double duty as the floor system or roof system in a building, or the deck of a bridge, which simultaneously supports gravity loads.

Parts of a diaphragm include:

- the collector (or membrane), used as a shear panel to carry in-plane shear
- The drag strut member, used to transfer the load to the shear walls or frames
- the chord, used to resist the tension and compression forces that develop in the diaphragm since the collector is usually incapable of handling these loads alone

Diaphragms are usually constructed of plywood or oriented strand board in timber construction; metal deck or composite metal deck in steel construction; or a concrete slab in concrete construction.

The two primary types of the diaphragm are flexible and rigid. Flexible diaphragms resist lateral forces depending on the tributary area, irrespective of the flexibility of the members to they are transferring force to. On the other hand, rigid diaphragms transfer load to frames or shear walls depending on their flexibility and their location in the structure. Diaphragms that cannot be classified as either flexible or rigid are referred to as semirigid. The flexibility of a diaphragm affects the distribution of lateral forces to the vertical components of the lateral force-resisting elements in a structure.
