= Multnomah County, Oregon =

County in Oregon, United States

- County
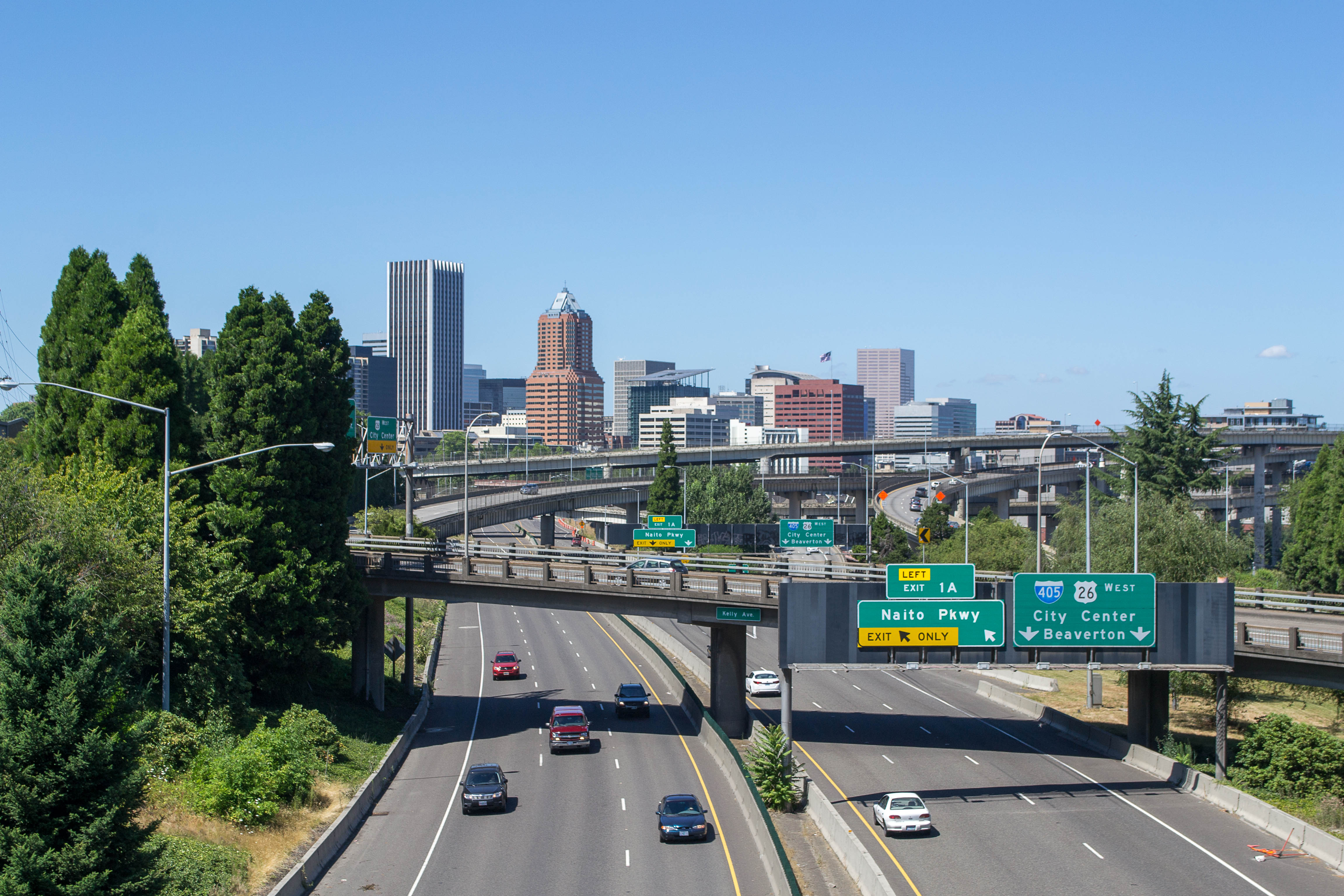
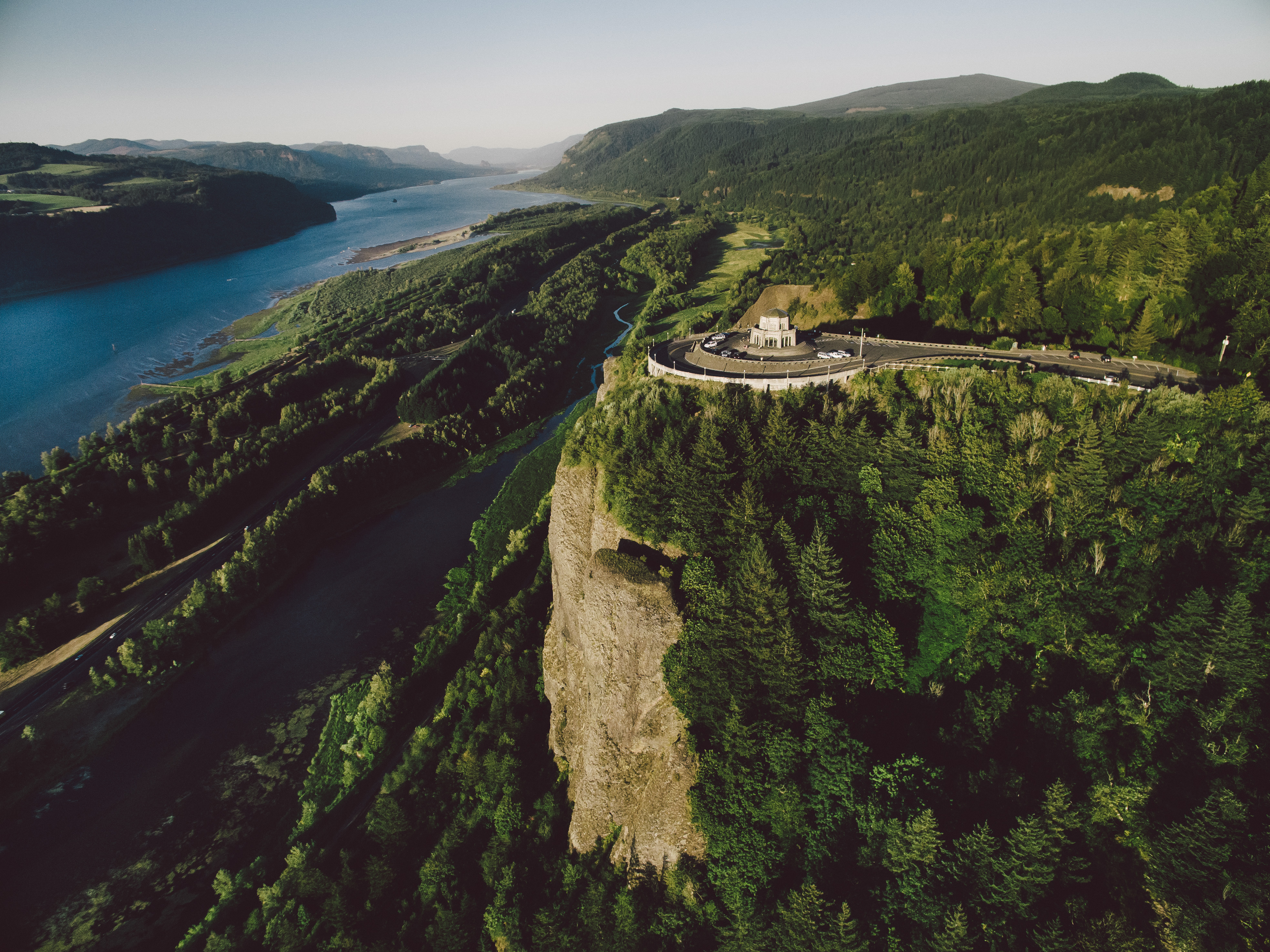
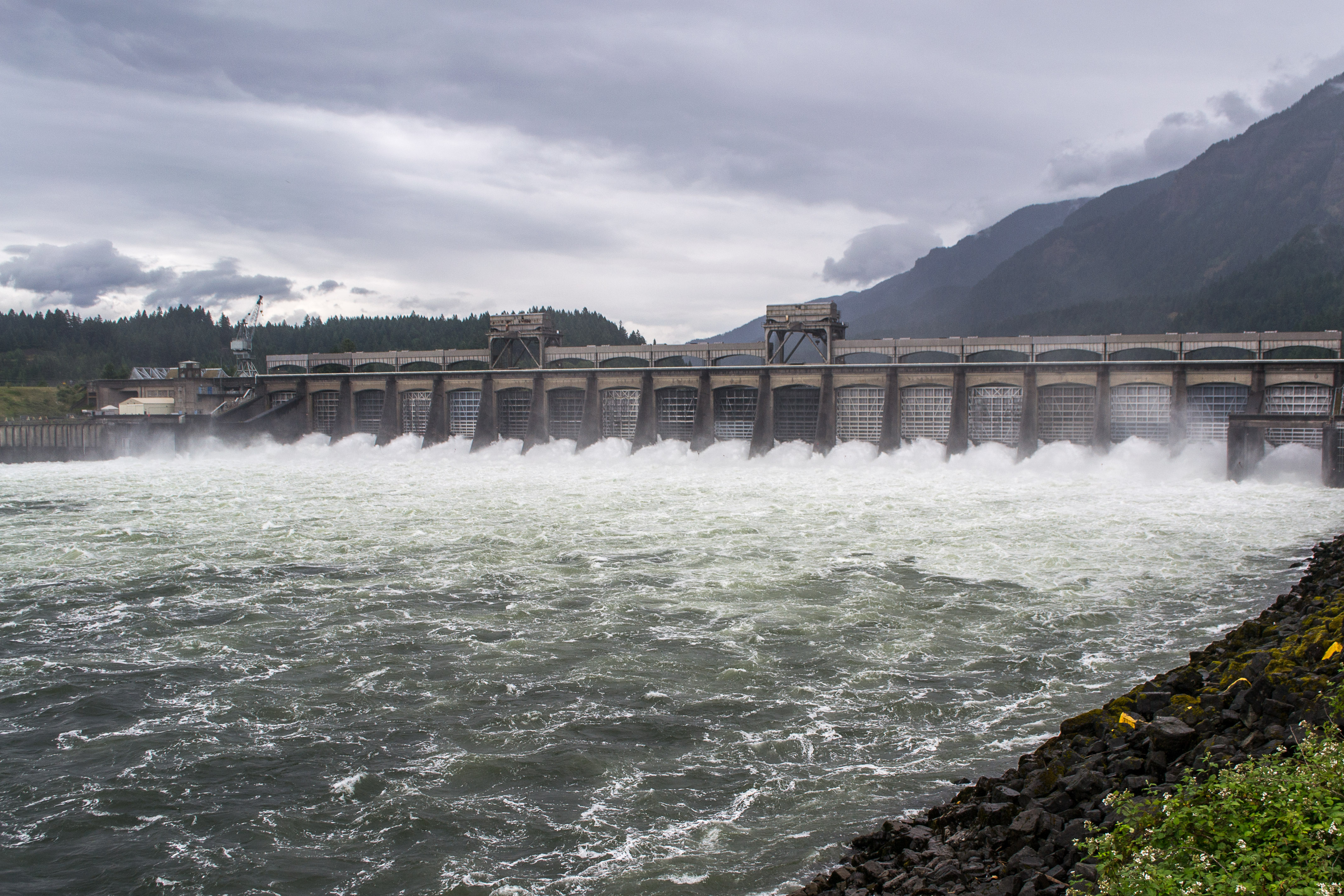
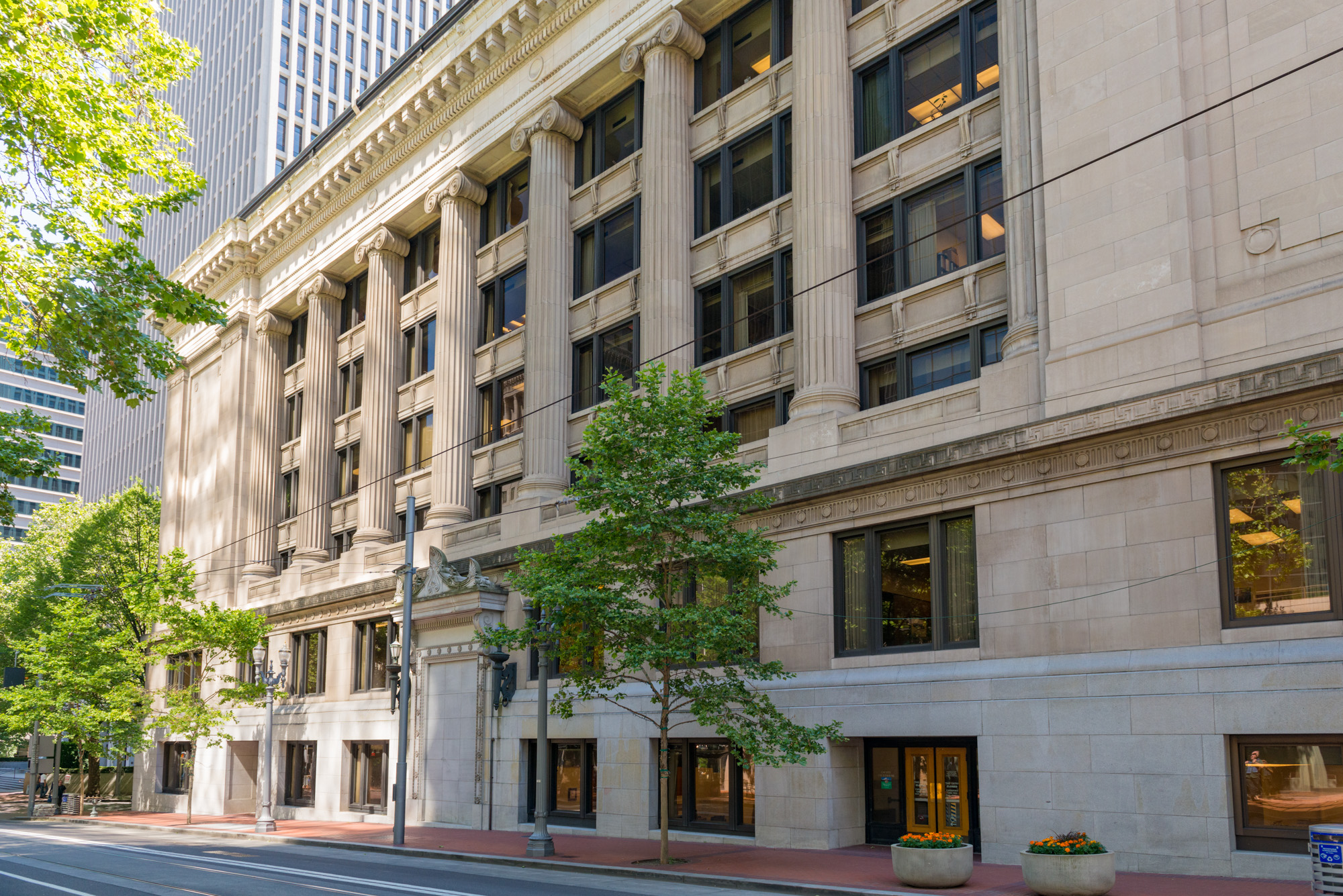
- Downtown Portland Crown Point and the Columbia River Gorge Bonneville Dam Old Multnomah County Courthouse

- Seal Logo

- Location within the U.S. state of Oregon
- Coordinates: 45°32′N 122°25′W
- Country: United States
- State: Oregon
- Founded: December 22, 1854
- Named for: Multnomah people
- Seat: Portland
- Largest city: Portland

Area
  - Total: 466 sq mi (1,210 km^{2})
  - Land: 431 sq mi (1,120 km^{2})
  - Water: 34 sq mi (88 km^{2}) 7.4%

Population (2020)
  - Total: 815,428
  - Estimate (2025): 795,391 ▼
  - Density: 1,890/sq mi (730/km^{2})
- Time zone: UTC−8 (Pacific)
  - Summer (DST): UTC−7 (PDT)
- Congressional districts: 1st, 3rd, 5th
- Website: www.multco.us

Multnomah County /mʌltˈnoʊmə/ is one of the 36 counties in the U.S. state of Oregon. As of the 2020 census, the county's population was 815,428. Multnomah County is part of the Portland metropolitan area. It is the state's smallest and most populous county, and its county seat, Portland, is the state's most populous city.

Map of Multnomah County

== History ==
The area of the lower Willamette River has been inhabited for thousands of years, including by the Multnomah band of Chinookan peoples long before European contact, as evidenced by the nearby Cathlapotle village, just downstream.

Multnomah County (the 13th in Oregon Territory) was created on December 22, 1854, formed out of two other Oregon counties – the eastern part of Washington County and the northern part of Clackamas County. Its creation was a result of a petition earlier that year by businessmen in Portland complaining of the inconvenient location of the Washington County seat in Hillsboro and of the share of Portland tax revenues leaving the city to support Washington County farmers. County commissioners met for the first time on January 17, 1855.

The county is named after the Chinookan word for the "lower river", multnomah, matlnomaq, or máɬnumax̣ being interpretive English spellings of the same word. In Chinook jargon, Ne-matlnomaq, means the "place of matlnomaq" or the (singular) Ne-matlnomag, "the lower river", from the Oregon City Falls toward the Columbia River. Alternatively, Chinookan máɬnumax̣ (also nímaɬnumax̣) "those toward water" (or "toward the Columbia River", known in Chinookan as ímaɬ or wímaɬ, "the great water"). Explorer William Clark wrote in his journal: "I entered this river...called Multnomah...from a nation who reside on Wappato Island, a little below the enterence" (quoted from Willamette Landings by H.M. Corning).(see:Portland Basin Chinookan Villages in the early 1800s, Boyd and Zenk,) Although Clark refers to the Willamette River as Multnomah, he may not have understood the meaning. Simply put, Multnomah ("down river" or "toward the great water") is the shortened form of nematlnomaq/nímaɬnumax̣.

In 1924, the county's three commissioners were indicted and recalled by voters "in response to 'gross irregularities' in the award of contracts for construction of the Burnside and Ross Island bridges"; since all three had been supported by the Ku Klux Klan, their recall also helped reduce that organization's influence in the city.

Vanport, built north of Portland in 1943 to house workers for Kaiser Shipyards, was destroyed by a flood five years later.

In 1968, the Oregon Legislative Assembly referred a bill, Ballot Measure 5, to voters that would amend the state constitution to allow for consolidated city-county governments when their populations are over 300,000. The 1968 voters' pamphlet noted that Multnomah County would be the only county in Oregon affected by the measure and voters approved the referendum in the 1968 general election. Since the approval of Measure 5 in 1968, an initiative to merge the county with Portland has been considered and placed on the county ballot several times.

=== Since 2000 ===
In the 2000 presidential election, Multnomah county played a decisive role in determining the winner of the state's electoral votes. Al Gore carried the county by 104,764 votes, enough to offset the 97,999 vote advantage that George W. Bush had earned among Oregon's 35 other counties. The Democratic tilt was repeated in 2004, when John Kerry won by 161,146 votes, and in 2008, when Barack Obama won by 204,525 votes.

In February 2001, the Multnomah County Board of Commissioners unanimously accepted the recommendation of the Library Advisory Board and authorized the library to enter into a lawsuit to stop the Children's Internet Protection Act. The US Supreme Court ultimately decided in 2003 that the law was constitutional in US v. ALA. However, the library chose to turn down $104,000 per year of federal funding under CIPA to be able to continue to offer unfiltered Internet access.

Faced with decreasing government revenues due to a recession in the local economy, voters approved a three-year local income tax (Measure 26–48) on May 20, 2003, to prevent further cuts in schools, police protection, and social services.

After that, though, Linn and the three commissioners developed a public feud, with the latter becoming known as the "mean girls". The county government has also faced significant budget issues, including not being able to open the Wapato Corrections Facility since it was built in 2003.

== Geography ==
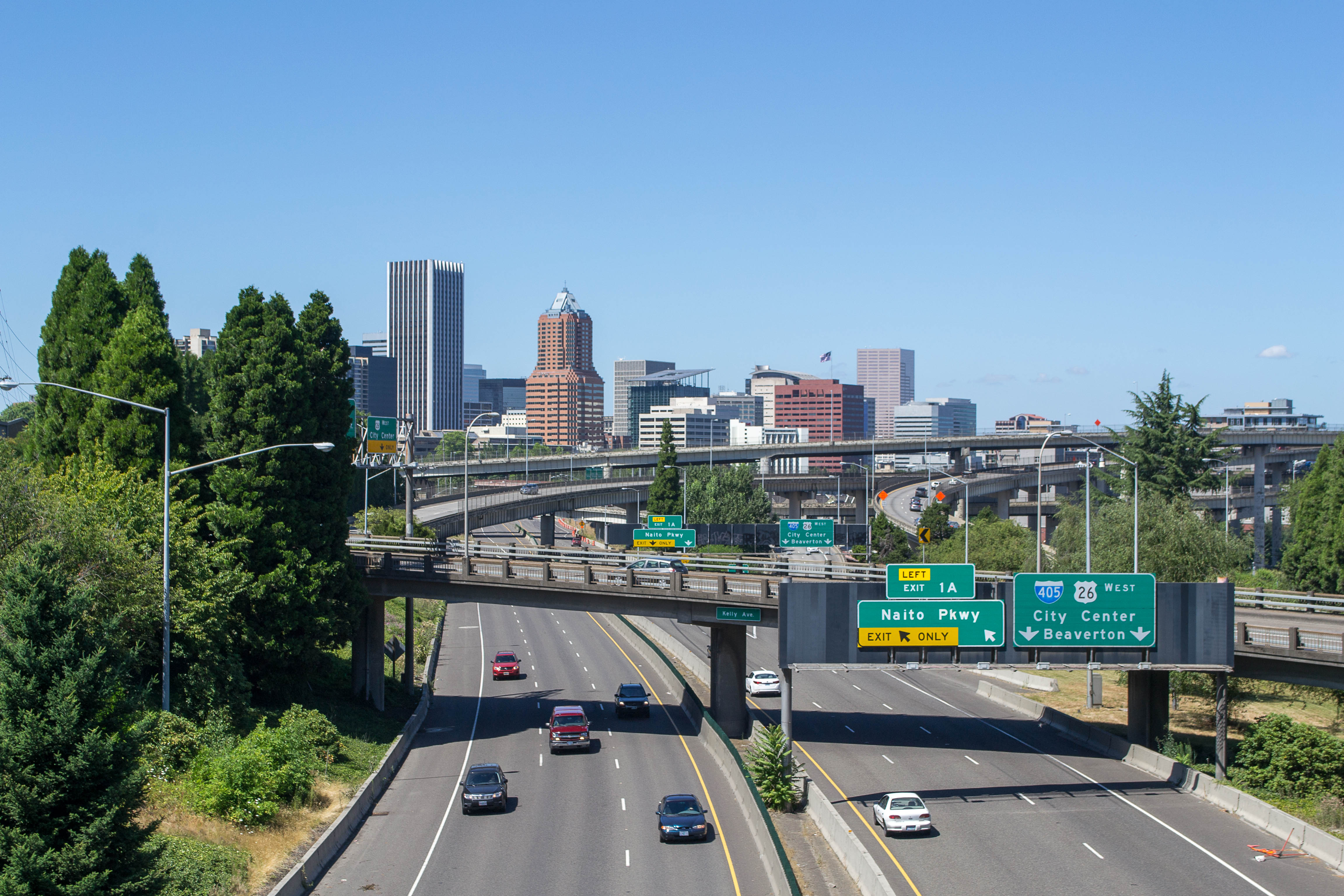
Portland

According to the United States Census Bureau, the county has a total area of 466 square miles (1,210 km^{2}), of which 34 square miles (88 km^{2}) (7.4%) are covered by water. It is the smallest county in Oregon by area. It is located along the south side of the Columbia River.

The county includes a number of extinct volcanoes in the Boring Lava Field. The Oregon side of the Columbia River Gorge forms the eastern portion of the county's northern border.

=== Major highways ===
- I-5
- I-84
- I-205
- I-405
- US 26
- US 30
- US 30 Byp.
- US 99 (decommissioned)
- OR 10
- OR 43
- OR 120
- OR 213

=== Adjacent counties ===
- Columbia County – northwest
- Clark County, Washington – north
- Skamania County, Washington – northeast
- Hood River County – east
- Clackamas County – south
- Washington County – west

=== National protected areas ===
- Columbia River Gorge National Scenic Area (part)
- Mount Hood National Forest (part)

== Demographics ==
Historical population
| Census | Pop. | Note | %± |
|---|---|---|---|
| 1860 | 4,150 | | — |
| 1870 | 11,510 | | 177.3% |
| 1880 | 25,203 | | 119.0% |
| 1890 | 74,884 | | 197.1% |
| 1900 | 103,167 | | 37.8% |
| 1910 | 226,261 | | 119.3% |
| 1920 | 275,898 | | 21.9% |
| 1930 | 338,241 | | 22.6% |
| 1940 | 355,099 | | 5.0% |
| 1950 | 471,537 | | 32.8% |
| 1960 | 522,813 | | 10.9% |
| 1970 | 556,667 | | 6.5% |
| 1980 | 562,640 | | 1.1% |
| 1990 | 583,887 | | 3.8% |
| 2000 | 660,486 | | 13.1% |
| 2010 | 735,334 | | 11.3% |
| 2020 | 815,428 | | 10.9% |
| 2025 (est.) | 795,391 | ▼ | −2.5% |
U.S. Decennial Census; 1790–1960 1900–1990; 1990–2000 2010–2020

=== Racial and ethnic composition ===
| Racial composition | 2020 | 2010 | 2000 | 1990 | 1980 | 1970 | 1960 |
|---|---|---|---|---|---|---|---|
| White (non-Hispanic) | 65.7% | 72.1% | 76.5% | 85.3% | 88.4% | – | – |
| Hispanic or Latino | 12.7% | 10.9% | 7.5% | 3.1% | 2.0% | 1.5% | – |
| Asian (non-Hispanic) | 7.5% | 6.5% | 5.7% | 4.6% | – | – | 1.2% |
| Black or African American (non-Hispanic) | 5.4% | 5.4% | 5.6% | 6.0% | 5.3% | 3.9% | 3.0% |
| Native American (non-Hispanic) | 0.7% | 0.8% | 1.0% | 1.1% | – | – | 0.2% |
| Pacific Islander (non-Hispanic) | 0.7% | 0.5% | 0.3% | – | – | – | – |
| Mixed race (non-Hispanic) | 6.8% | 3.6% | 4.0% | – | – | – | – |

Multnomah County, Oregon – Racial and ethnic composition Note: the US Census treats Hispanic/Latino as an ethnic category. This table excludes Latinos from the racial categories and assigns them to a separate category. Hispanics/Latinos may be of any race.
| Race / Ethnicity (NH = Non-Hispanic) | Pop 1980 | Pop 1990 | Pop 2000 | Pop 2010 | Pop 2020 | % 1980 | % 1990 | % 2000 | % 2010 | % 2020 |
|---|---|---|---|---|---|---|---|---|---|---|
| White alone (NH) | 497,315 | 497,700 | 505,492 | 530,303 | 535,623 | 88.39% | 85.24% | 76.53% | 72.12% | 65.69% |
| Black or African American alone (NH) | 29,486 | 34,415 | 36,592 | 39,919 | 43,793 | 5.24% | 5.89% | 5.54% | 5.43% | 5.37% |
| Native American or Alaska Native alone (NH) | 4,998 | 6,122 | 5,754 | 5,527 | 5,455 | 0.89% | 1.05% | 0.87% | 0.75% | 0.67% |
| Asian alone (NH) | 14,163 | 26,626 | 37,344 | 47,508 | 61,280 | 2.52% | 4.56% | 5.65% | 6.46% | 7.52% |
| Native Hawaiian or Pacific Islander alone (NH) | x | x | 2,206 | 3,870 | 5,251 | x | x | 0.33% | 0.53% | 0.64% |
| Other race alone (NH) | 5,439 | 634 | 1,216 | 1,520 | 4,885 | 0.97% | 0.11% | 0.18% | 0.21% | 0.60% |
| Mixed race or Multiracial (NH) | x | x | 22,275 | 26,549 | 55,388 | x | x | 3.37% | 3.61% | 6.79% |
| Hispanic or Latino (any race) | 11,239 | 18,390 | 49,607 | 80,138 | 103,753 | 2.00% | 3.15% | 7.51% | 10.90% | 12.72% |
| Total | 562,640 | 583,887 | 660,486 | 735,334 | 815,428 | 100.00% | 100.00% | 100.00% | 100.00% | 100.00% |

=== 2020 census ===
As of the 2020 census, the county had a population of 815,428. Of the residents, 18.2% were under the age of 18 and 14.3% were 65 years of age or older; the median age was 37.7 years. For every 100 females there were 97.6 males, and for every 100 females age 18 and over there were 96.0 males. 98.7% of residents lived in urban areas and 1.3% lived in rural areas. The population density was 1,891.2 people per square mile (730.2 people/km^{2}).

The racial makeup of the county was 68.2% White, 5.6% Black or African American, 1.2% American Indian and Alaska Native, 7.6% Asian, 0.7% Native Hawaiian and Pacific Islander, 5.9% from some other race, and 10.8% from two or more races. Hispanic or Latino residents of any race comprised 12.7% of the population.

There were 341,507 households in the county, including 180,512 families; 24.3% had children under the age of 18 living with them and 29.0% had a female householder with no spouse or partner present. About 32.6% of all households were made up of individuals and 10.1% had someone living alone who was 65 years of age or older.

There were 363,996 housing units, of which 6.2% were vacant. Among occupied housing units, 51.3% were owner-occupied and 48.7% were renter-occupied. The homeowner vacancy rate was 1.2% and the rental vacancy rate was 6.2%.

The median income for a household in the county was $83,668 and the per-capita income was $49,713. 12.1% of the population lived below the poverty line.

=== 2010 census ===
As of the 2010 census, there were 735,334 people, 304,540 households, and 163,539 families resided in the county. The population density was 1,704.9 inhabitants per square mile (658.3/km^{2}). There were 324,832 housing units at an average density of 753.2 units per square mile (290.8 units/km^{2}). The racial makeup of the county was 76.5% White, 6.5% Asian, 5.6% Black or African American, 1.1% American Indian, 0.5% Pacific Islander, 5.1% from other races, and 4.6% from two or more races. Those of Hispanic or Latino origin made up 10.9% of the population. In terms of ancestry, 19.4% were German, 12.2% were Irish, 11.4% were English, and 4.2% were American.

Of the 304,540 households, 27.0% had children under 18 living with them, 38.6% were married couples living together, 10.7% had a female householder with no husband present, 46.3% were not families, and 32.6% of all households were made up of individuals. The average household size was 2.35 and the average family size was 3.03. The median age was 35.7 years.

The median income for a household in the county was $49,618 and for a family was $62,956. Males had a median income of $45,152 versus $38,211 for females. The per capita income for the county was $28,883. About 11.3% of families and 16.0% of the population were below the poverty line, including 21.1% of those under age 18 and 12.1% of those age 65 or over.

=== 2000 census ===
As of the 2000 census, there were 660,486 people, 272,098 households, and 152,102 families in the county. The population density was 1,518/sq mi (586/km^{2}). There were 288,561 housing units had an average density of 663.sq mi (256/km2). The racial makeup of the county was 79.16% White, 5.70% Asian, 5.67% Black or African American, 1.03% Native American, 0.35% Pacific Islander, 4.03% from other races, and 4.07% from two or more races. About 7.51% of the population were Hispanics or Latinos of any race; 16.0% were of German, 9.0% English, 8.8% Irish, and 5.1% American ancestry; 83.5% spoke English, 6.3% Spanish, 1.7% Vietnamese, and 1.3% Russian as their first language. Of the 272,098 households, 26.5% had children under 18 living with them, 40.9% were married couples living together, 10.8% had a female householder with no husband present, and 44.1% were not families. About 32.5% of all households were made up of individuals, and 8.6% had someone living alone who was 65 or older. The average household size was 2.37, and the average family size was 3.03.

In the county, the age distribution was 22.3% under 18, 10.3% from 18 to 24, 33.8% from 25 to 44, 22.5% from 45 to 64, and 11.1% who were 65 or older. The median age was 35 years. For every 100 females, there were 98.00 males. For every 100 females 18 and over, there were 96.10 males.

The median income for a household in the county was $41,278, and for a family was $51,118. Males had a median income of $36,036 versus $29,337 for females. The per capita income for the county was $22,606. 12.70% of the population and 8.20% of families were below the poverty line. Out of the total population, 15.40% of those under the age of 18 and 9.80% of those 65 and older were living below the poverty line.

== Law and government ==
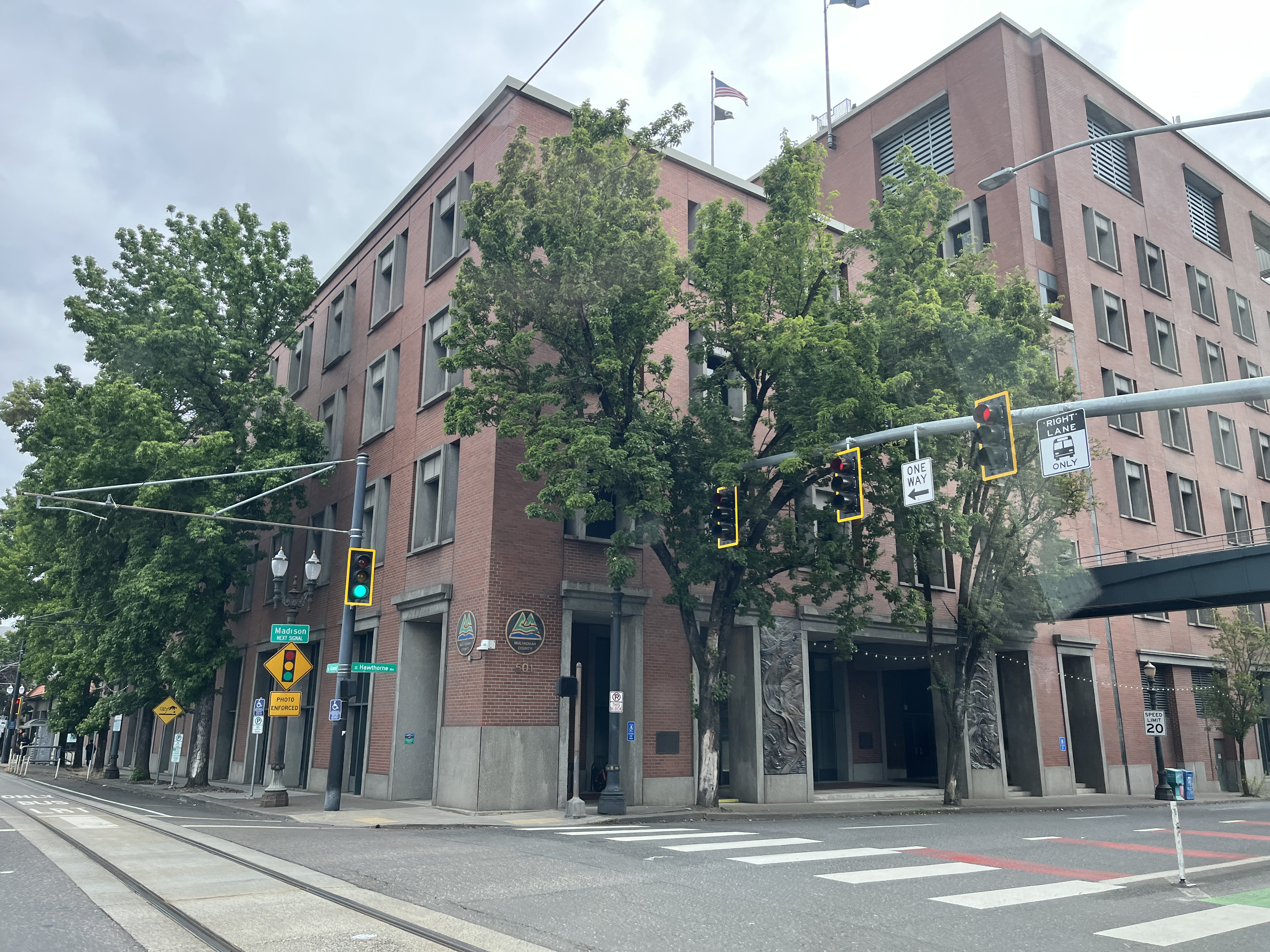
The Multnomah Building serves as the seat and administrative headquarters of Multnomah County.

Multnomah County was a strongly Republican county for much of the first half of the 20th century. Since 1964, it has been the strongest Democratic bastion in Oregon, even in the Republican landslides of 1972 and 1984.

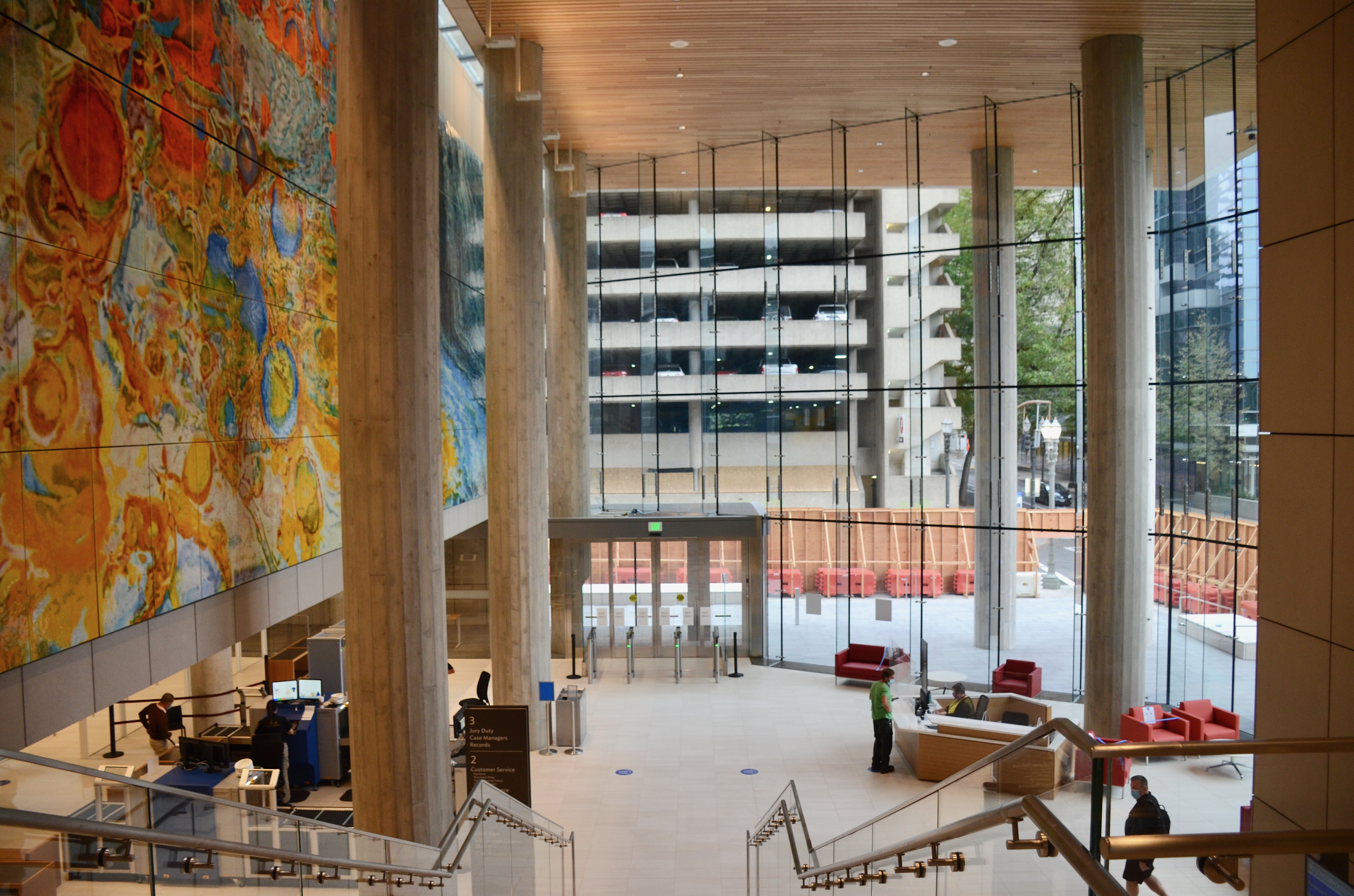
Lobby of the new Multnomah County Central Courthouse, which opened in 2020

As Multnomah County is by far the most populous county in Oregon, Democratic majorities in the county are often enough to swing the results in statewide elections. In 2008, Democratic challenger Jeff Merkley unseated incumbent two-term Senator Gordon Smith, though Smith carried 28 of Oregon's 36 counties. Merkley carried Multnomah County by over 142,000 votes, however, enough to allow him to defeat Smith by 59,100 votes.

The county courthouse is located in downtown Portland. The Multnomah County Central Courthouse opened in 2020, replacing a century-old building nearby that was in need of seismic retrofitting.

=== Elected officials ===
==== County Commission ====
| District | Name | Notes |
|---|---|---|
| Chair | Jessica Vega Pederson | |
| Commissioner, District 1 | Meghan Moyer | |
| Commissioner, District 2 | Shannon Singleton | |
| Commissioner, District 3 | Julia Brim-Edwards | |
| Commissioner, District 4 | Vince Jones-Dixon | |

==== County officials ====
| Office | Name | Notes |
|---|---|---|
| District Attorney | Nathan Vasquez | |
| Sheriff | Nicole Morrisey O’Donnell | |
| Auditor | Jennifer McGuirk | |

=== Appointed officials ===
- Elections: Tim Scott
- Finance: Mark Campbell
- Surveyor: James Clayton

=== State legislators ===
Map of Multnomah County Senate-Representative District Maps

=== Homeless Services Department ===
The Homeless Services Department is a department in the county that provide services and care to those experiencing homelessness. The department oversees where homeless services funds that come from tax payers and federal funds are allocated, which mostly go to various nonprofit organizations. It was formed in 2016 as the Joint Office of Homeless Services. The name was changed to Homeless Services Department in 2025.

In 2024, city councilors considered withdrawing from this partnership, but left it in place after the election of mayor Keith Wilson who ran on a platform of ending unsheltered homelessness.

Earlier in 2024 it was reported that the JOHS increased people it was able to put into housing by 28 percent compared to 2023.

In February 2025, the department reported a budget gap of $104 million, saying it would not be able to meet its commitments this year.

United States presidential election results for Multnomah County, Oregon
| Year | Republican | | Democratic | | Third party(ies) | |
| Year | No. | % | No. | % | No. | % |
|---|---|---|---|---|---|---|
| 1880 | 3,211 | 54.14% | 2,720 | 45.86% | 0 | 0.00% |
| 1884 | 5,058 | 55.99% | 3,880 | 42.95% | 95 | 1.05% |
| 1888 | 6,250 | 59.83% | 3,996 | 38.25% | 201 | 1.92% |
| 1892 | 8,041 | 48.29% | 2,040 | 12.25% | 6,572 | 39.46% |
| 1896 | 11,824 | 63.53% | 6,453 | 34.67% | 334 | 1.79% |
| 1900 | 9,948 | 65.46% | 4,436 | 29.19% | 814 | 5.36% |
| 1904 | 13,692 | 73.88% | 2,324 | 12.54% | 2,518 | 13.59% |
| 1908 | 17,819 | 59.82% | 9,850 | 33.07% | 2,118 | 7.11% |
| 1912 | 9,212 | 23.05% | 13,894 | 34.76% | 16,862 | 42.19% |
| 1916 | 41,458 | 51.67% | 35,755 | 44.56% | 3,022 | 3.77% |
| 1920 | 44,806 | 58.06% | 27,607 | 35.77% | 4,761 | 6.17% |
| 1924 | 48,866 | 49.98% | 21,733 | 22.23% | 27,165 | 27.79% |
| 1928 | 75,731 | 61.64% | 45,177 | 36.77% | 1,951 | 1.59% |
| 1932 | 47,201 | 35.56% | 78,898 | 59.44% | 6,644 | 5.01% |
| 1936 | 41,405 | 27.18% | 106,561 | 69.96% | 4,353 | 2.86% |
| 1940 | 73,612 | 42.72% | 97,595 | 56.64% | 1,106 | 0.64% |
| 1944 | 78,279 | 42.04% | 105,516 | 56.66% | 2,423 | 1.30% |
| 1948 | 86,519 | 45.77% | 93,703 | 49.57% | 8,806 | 4.66% |
| 1952 | 132,602 | 55.01% | 107,118 | 44.44% | 1,339 | 0.56% |
| 1956 | 129,658 | 52.80% | 115,896 | 47.20% | 0 | 0.00% |
| 1960 | 127,271 | 50.53% | 124,273 | 49.34% | 338 | 0.13% |
| 1964 | 81,683 | 33.51% | 161,040 | 66.07% | 1,016 | 0.42% |
| 1968 | 106,831 | 43.87% | 124,651 | 51.19% | 12,036 | 4.94% |
| 1972 | 118,219 | 46.73% | 125,470 | 49.60% | 9,269 | 3.66% |
| 1976 | 112,400 | 44.40% | 129,060 | 50.98% | 11,699 | 4.62% |
| 1980 | 101,606 | 39.23% | 120,487 | 46.53% | 36,875 | 14.24% |
| 1984 | 119,932 | 45.17% | 144,179 | 54.30% | 1,428 | 0.54% |
| 1988 | 95,561 | 36.50% | 161,361 | 61.63% | 4,921 | 1.88% |
| 1992 | 72,326 | 24.25% | 165,081 | 55.34% | 60,884 | 20.41% |
| 1996 | 71,094 | 26.33% | 159,878 | 59.22% | 38,989 | 14.44% |
| 2000 | 83,677 | 28.20% | 188,441 | 63.52% | 24,567 | 8.28% |
| 2004 | 98,439 | 27.14% | 259,585 | 71.57% | 4,670 | 1.29% |
| 2008 | 75,171 | 20.61% | 279,696 | 76.69% | 9,843 | 2.70% |
| 2012 | 75,302 | 20.65% | 274,887 | 75.37% | 14,533 | 3.98% |
| 2016 | 67,954 | 17.03% | 292,561 | 73.30% | 38,588 | 9.67% |
| 2020 | 82,995 | 17.90% | 367,249 | 79.21% | 13,415 | 2.89% |
| 2024 | 70,759 | 17.08% | 325,927 | 78.68% | 17,564 | 4.24% |

=== Politics ===
There were 574,215 registered voters in Multnomah County as of January 2026.

Voter registration and party enrollment as of January 2026
| Party | Number of voters | Percentage |
|---|---|---|
| Democratic | 277,868 | 48.4% |
| Republican | 55,446 | 9.7% |
| Non Affiliated | 203,758 | 35.5% |
| Constitution | 405 | 0.1% |
| Independent | 22,126 | 3.9% |
| Libertarian | 2,733 | 0.5% |
| No Labels | 1,398 | 0.2% |
| Pacific Green | 2,486 | 0.4% |
| Progressive | 1,352 | 0.2% |
| We The People | 59 | <0.1% |
| Working Families | 3,202 | 0.6% |
| Other | 3,382 | 0.6% |
| Total | 574,215 | 100% |

== Economy ==
The principal industries of Multnomah County are manufacturing, transportation, wholesale and retail trade, and tourism. Since Oregon does not have a sales tax, it attracts shoppers from southwest Washington.

The Port of Portland, established in 1891 and combined with the City of Portland's Commission of Public Docks in 1971, ranks third in total waterborne commerce on the West Coast, and 31st in the nation for total tonnage according to the 2009 American Association of Port Authorities' Port Industries Statistics.

Out of the 199 cities and counties located in the five West Coast states, Multnomah County ranked 198th in private sector job creation from 1997 to 2009.

Employment in Multnomah County
| Supersecor | Average Annual Employment in 2024 |
| Total nonfarm employment | 510,000 |
| Mining, logging, and construction | 25,800 |
| Manufacturing | 29,400 |
| Trade, transportation, and utilities | 93,200 |
| Information | 11,000 |
| Financial activities | 31,500 |
| Professional and business services | 81,900 |
| Private education and health services | 85,100 |
| Leisure and hospitality | 52,000 |
| Other services | 19,000 |
| Government | 81,200 |

== Communities ==
=== Cities ===
- Albina (former)
- Fairview
- Gresham
- Lake Oswego (small portion)
- Maywood Park
- Milwaukie (small portion)
- Portland (county seat)
- St. Johns (former)
- Troutdale
- Wood Village

=== Census-designated places ===
- Cedar Mill (part)
- Centennial (former)
- Cully (former)
- Dunthorpe
- Hazelwood (former)
- Orient
- West Haven-Sylvan (part)

=== Unincorporated communities ===
- Bonneville
- Burlington
- Corbett
- Dodson
- Dunthorpe
- Holbrook
- Interlachen
- Latourell
- Orient
- Riverwood
- Springdale
- Warrendale

=== Former communities ===
- Vanport
- Bridal Veil

== Education ==
School districts include:

- Beaverton School District 48J
- Centennial School District 28J
- Corbett School District 39
- David Douglas School District 40
- Gresham-Barlow School District 1J
- Hillsboro School District 1J
- Lake Oswego School District 7J
- Parkrose School District 3
- Portland School District 1J
- Rainier School District 13
- Reynolds School District 7
- Riverdale School District 51J
- Scappoose School District 1J

Portland Community College serves western portions of the county and Mt. Hood Community College serves eastern portions.
