= Veritable Quandary =

Defunct restaurant in Portland, Oregon, U.S.

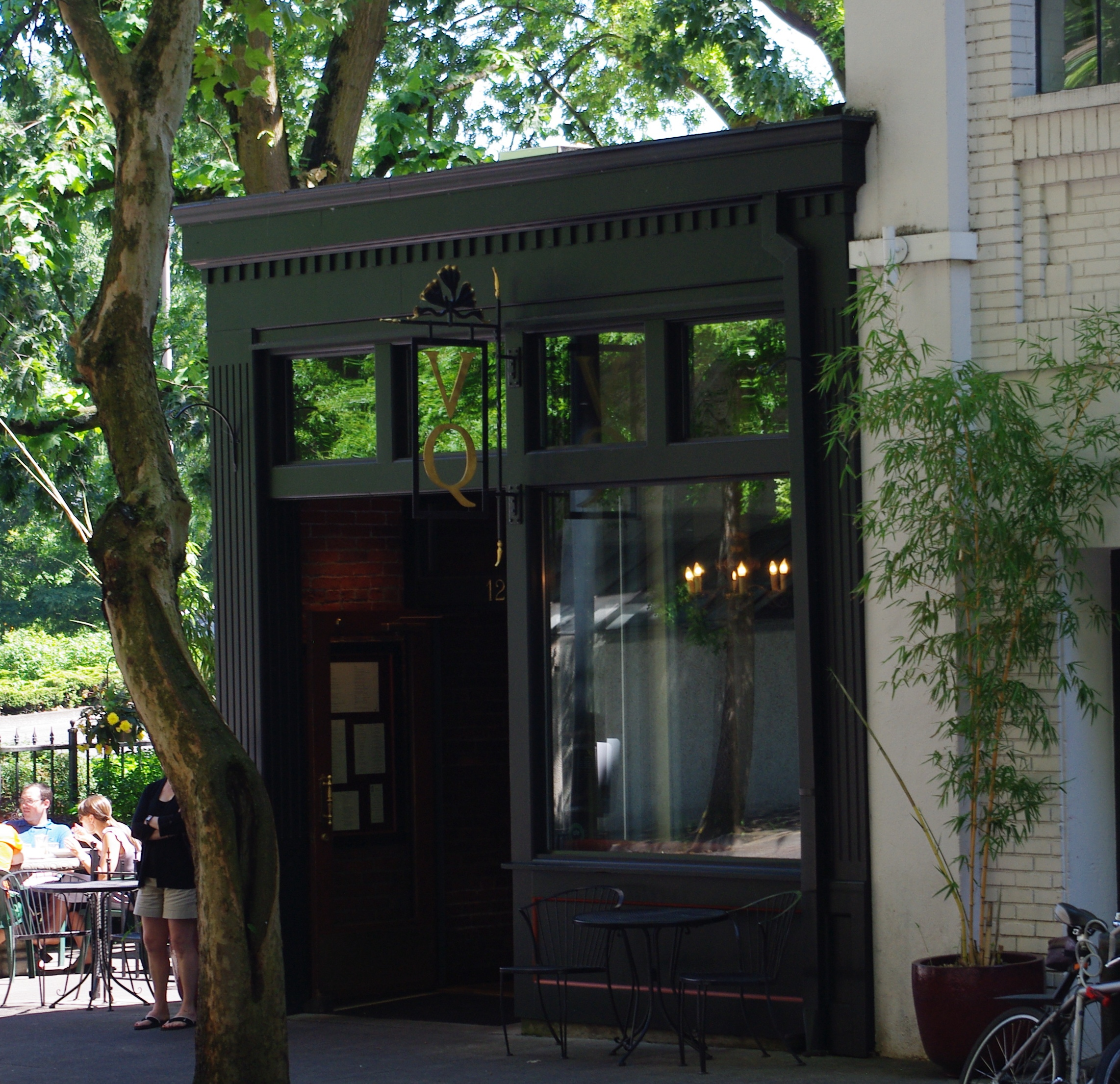
- Entrance to the restaurant in 2011
- Interactive map of Veritable Quandary

Restaurant information
- Established: 1971
- Closed: September 30, 2016
- Location: 1220 Southwest 1st Avenue, Portland, Multnomah, Oregon, United States
- Coordinates: 45.51395°N 122.67527°W
- Website: web.archive.org/web/20190305201936/http://www.veritablequandary.com/

Veritable Quandary, sometimes abbreviated as V.Q. or VQ, was a popular restaurant in downtown Portland, Oregon, United States. It was established in 1971.

== Description and history ==
The restaurant, established in 1971, featured a "market-driven" menu that changed based on products made available by local farmers. Its wine list included 35 varieties by the glass and more than 200 bottled selections; wines from around the world were available, though Veritable Quandary focused more on regional varieties.

In 2014, news outlets reported that Veritable Quandary employed 70–75 people and had an annual payroll of $1.5–1.7 million. Land adjacent to the restaurant was being considered as the site of a new Multnomah County courthouse.

The restaurant closed on September 30, 2016. The reason the restaurant was closed is because the city wanted the property for a new courthouse. The city opened the Multnomah County Courthouse on October 5, 2020.

The spin-off Q Restaurant and Bar opened in 2016.

== Reception ==
The restaurant's exterior in 2013

1859 said Veritable Quandary provides "relaxed fine dining experience amidst an atmosphere of old Portland charm", with a menu that is "sophisticated yet approachable to diners looking for a meal that is both delicious and hearty". According to Travel Portland, "The V.Q. has long been a favorite watering hole of lawyers, city planners and wheeler-dealers, as well as anyone looking to enjoy a good meal, a full bar and a great patio. It's the restaurant version of a railroad apartment: a long, slow march through the narrow bar and booth area to the lighter back precincts." Portland Monthly gave Veritable Quandary its award for "Best Patio Dining" in 2008. The restaurant's wine list has received Wine Spectator' "Award of Excellence" at least seven times.

In 2015, Willamette Week said of the restaurant and the owner's reaction to the courthouse's potential location: "Veritable Quandary has been one of the city's more famous and beloved restaurants... but most of the headlines it's made recently are unrelated to its gustatorial acclaim... If you can get past a teary-eyed king mourning the ruination of his patio's view, this place isn't bad. The dark wood bar and brick walls add a cozy yet sophisticated air to the gin joint... But you didn't come here to get hammered, that would merely be boorish. You came here to... join together with other well-to-do Portlanders to mourn the loss of a patio's ambience."
