= Multnomah Building =

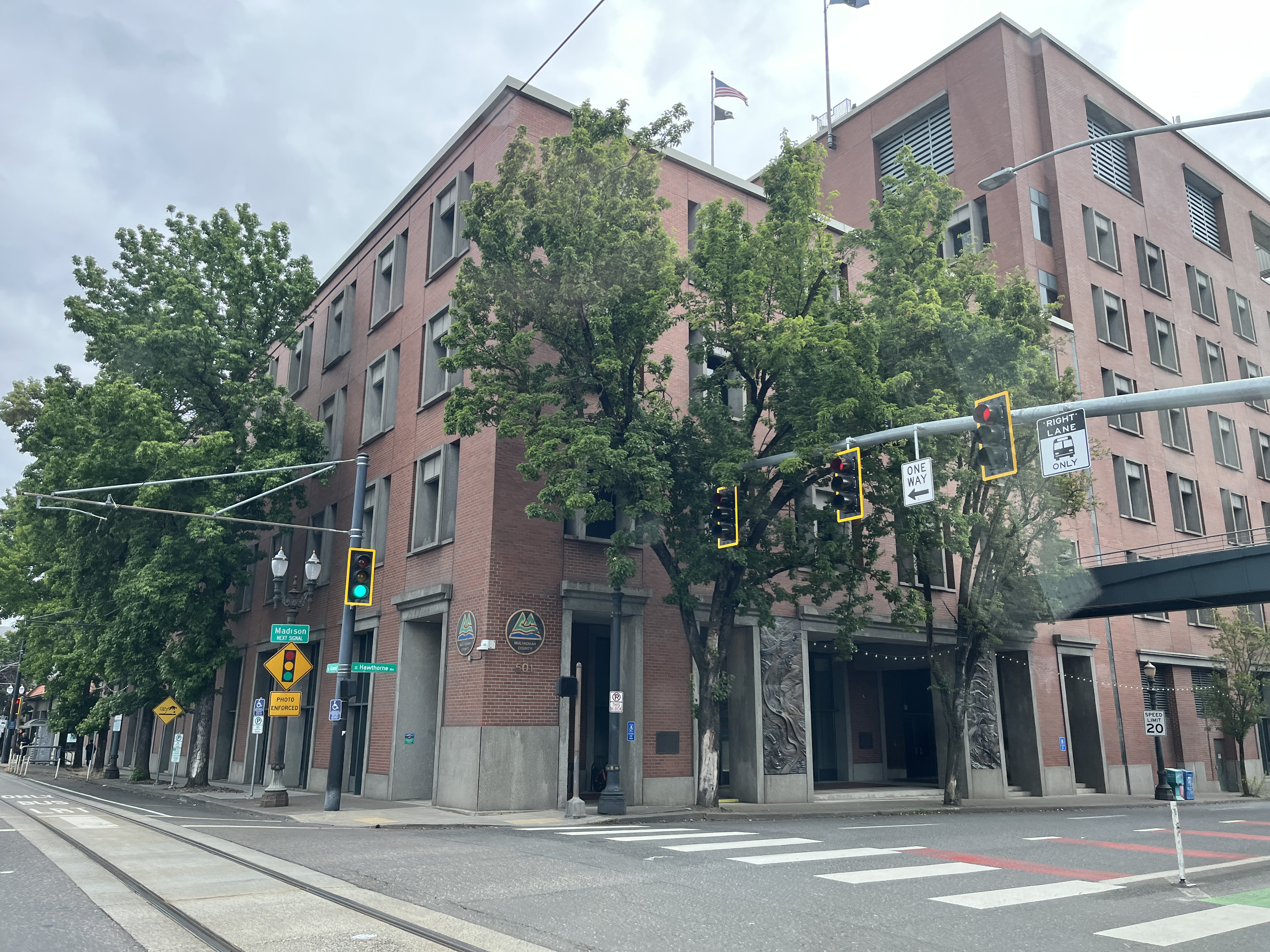
- The building's exterior, 2025
- Interactive map of the Multnomah Building area
- Former names: U.S. Bank National Association Building

General information
- Type: Government offices
- Location: 508 SE Hawthorne Blvd. Portland, Oregon, United States
- Coordinates: 45.512593°N 122.66026°W
- Completed: 1985
- Owner: County of Multnomah
- Operator: County of Multnomah

Design and construction
- Architect: Fletcher Farr Ayotte P.C.

The Multnomah Building is a building in Portland, Oregon that serves as the seat of government and administrative headquarters for Multnomah County, Oregon's most populated county. The building was constructed in 1985 as the US Bank National Association Building, although portions of the site's previous building, a 1920s car dealership, were kept. It was purchased by Multnomah County in 1999. The building houses the Multnomah County Board of Commissioners and the offices of several county departments.

It is located on the corner of Grand Avenue and Hawthorne Boulevard, at the east end of the Hawthorne Bridge. It features a green roof that was constructed in July 2003.

In 2005, two bas relief panels by Wayne Chabre, titled Connections, were added to the building's west facade. Each panel represent two different parts of the county, one urban, and one rural. The urban panel features abstract versions of Portland's bridges. The rural panel features rural roads and salmon.

The building is the location of Oregon's first same-sex marriages, performed in 2004.
