= Textile-reinforced mortar =

Textile-reinforced mortars (TRM) (also known as fabric-reinforced cementitious mortars (FRCM) are composite materials used in structural strengthening of existing buildings, most notably in seismic retrofitting. The material consists of bidirectional orthogonal textiles made from knitted, woven or simply stitched rovings of high-strength fibres (e.g. carbon, glass, aramid, basalt, or PBO), embedded in inorganic matrices (most commonly cement-based mortars). The textiles can also be made from natural fibres, e.g. hemp or flax. When combining plant fibers with mortars, one must pay attention to potential hydrolysis of hemicelluloses and lignin.

Compared to other composite materials used in seismic retrofitting such as fibre-reinforced polymers (FRP), the fibre sheets are replaced by open-grid textiles and the epoxy resin is replaced by mortar. The synergy between the materials is mainly achieved due to a mechanical interlock forming between the textile layers and the mortar. A benefit of TRMs is their compatibility with typical construction materials such as concrete and masonry, and their improved fire resistance and resistance to high temperatures.

TRM has been proven effective for strengthening both concrete and masonry structures, including the strengthening of masonry-infilled reinforced concrete structures. In combination with advanced thermal retrofitting materials or systems, TRM may offer avenues for the combined seismic and energy retrofitting of building envelopes

== See also ==
- Textile-reinforced concrete
