= Q Restaurant and Bar =

Restaurant in Portland, Oregon, U.S.

- The restaurant's exterior at night, 2026
- Interactive map of Q Restaurant and Bar

Restaurant information
- Established: November 21, 2016
- Location: 828 Southwest 2nd Avenue, Portland, Multnomah, Oregon, 97204, United States
- Coordinates: 45.5168°N 122.6751°W
- Website: q-portland.com

Q Restaurant and Bar, or simply Q, is a restaurant and bar in Portland, Oregon, United States. It has operated in downtown Portland since 2016, and is considered a "sequel" (or spin-off) of the defunct restaurant Veritable Quandary, which operated from 1971 to 2016.

== Description ==
Q Restaurant and Bar operates at Southwest Second Avenue and Taylor Street in downtown Portland. The interior has dark wood, leather booths, and panoramic windows. Jennifer Anderson of the Portland Tribune has described the interior as "sleek" and "polished".

The menu, described by Jules Rogers of Business Insider as "eclectic and globally inspired", has included salmon, ossobuco, bacon-wrapped dates, and salads with berries. Q has also served Reuben sandwiches, French fries, and cocktails. The Chocolate Nocello Souffle has candied walnuts and chocolate syrup.

== History ==
The restaurant opened on November 21, 2016, with Annie Cuggino as the executive chef. Approximately 60 workers from Veritable Quandary were hired to start at Q.

Like many restaurants, Q's operations were disrupted upon the arrival of the COVID-19 pandemic. The business received funds from the Small Business Administration as part of the American Rescue Plan Act of 2021.
