= Multnomah County Central Courthouse =

Courthouse in Portland, Oregon, U.S.

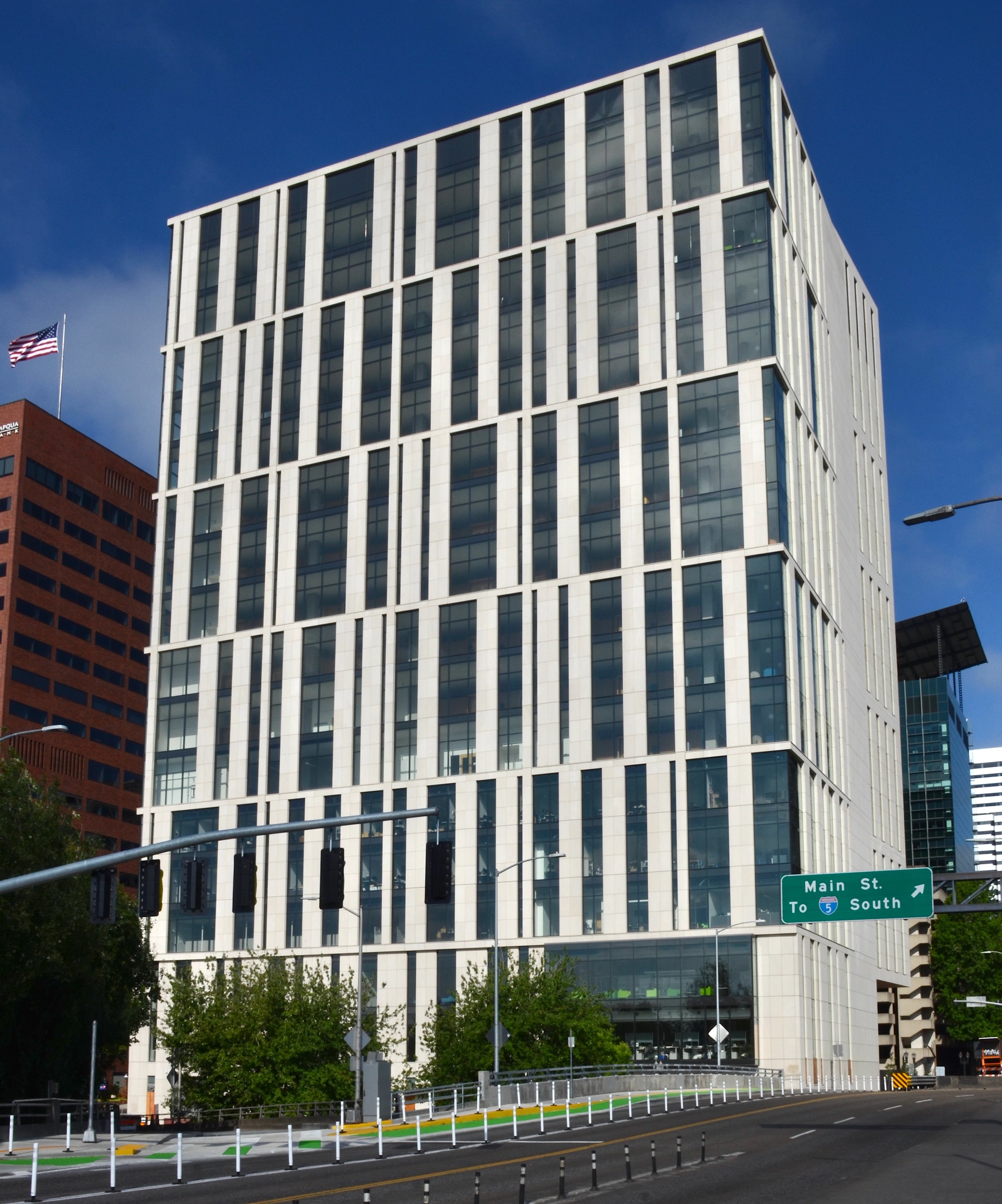
- Viewed from east in 2021
- Interactive map of the Multnomah County Central Courthouse area

General information
- Status: Open
- Location: 1200 SW First Ave., Portland, Oregon, U.S.
- Coordinates: 45.514°N 122.675°W
- Groundbreaking: October 2016
- Topped-out: November 9, 2018
- Completed: September 2020
- Opened: October 5, 2020
- Cost: $324.5 million
- Owner: Multnomah County

Height
- Height: 325 feet (99 m)

Technical details
- Floor count: 17

Design and construction
- Architect: SRG Partnership
- Main contractor: Hoffman Construction Company

References
- https://multco.us/central-courthouse/news/contractor-teams-selected-downtown-courthouse

The Multnomah County Central Courthouse serves as the courthouse for Multnomah County, Oregon. It is located in downtown Portland, Oregon, the county seat. It opened in October 2020, replacing a nearby building that had been constructed between 1909 and 1914.

Ground was broken on the project to build the new courthouse in October 2016, at which time it was scheduled to be completed in 2020 and cost $300 million. It reached its full height of 325 feet (99 m) on November 9, 2018. The building opened to the public on October 5, 2020.

== See also ==
- List of tallest buildings in Portland, Oregon
- Veritable Quandary
