= Multnomah County Courthouse =

Historic building in Portland, Oregon, U.S.

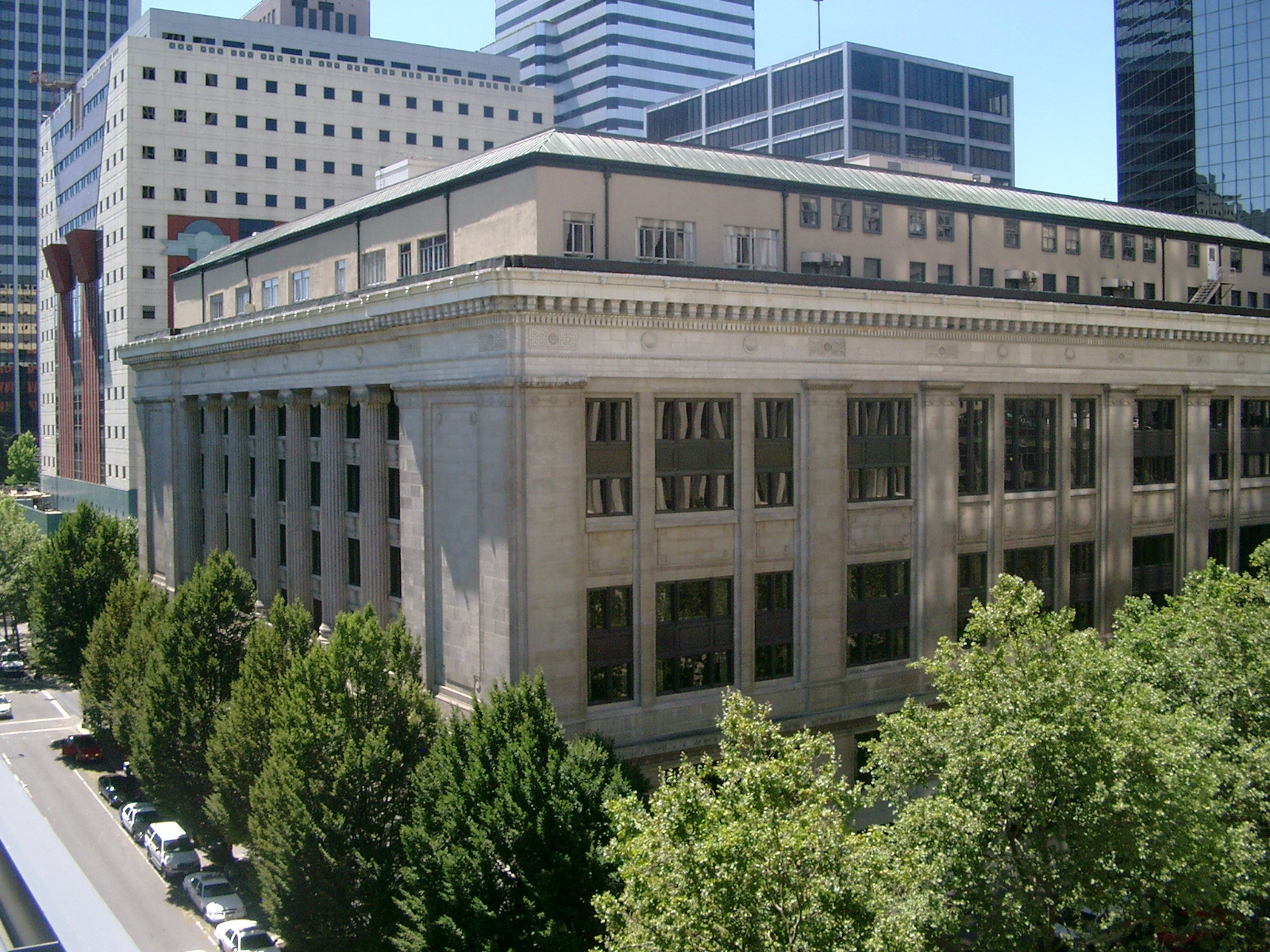
- Seen from the northeast in 2006, showing the building's 4th Avenue (left) and Salmon Street sides
- Interactive map of the Multnomah County Courthouse area

General information
- Status: Closed as a courthouse, awaiting repurposing
- Architectural style: Neoclassical
- Location: 1021 SW 4th Ave., Portland, Oregon, USA
- Cost: $1.6 million
- Owner: NBP Capital (since November 2018)

Design and construction
- Architect: Whidden & Lewis
- Multnomah County Courthouse
- U.S. National Register of Historic Places
- Portland Historic Landmark
- Coordinates: 45°30′59″N 122°40′42″W
- Built: 1911/1914
- Visitation: 3000/day (2011)
- NRHP reference No.: 79002136
- Added to NRHP: June 11, 1979

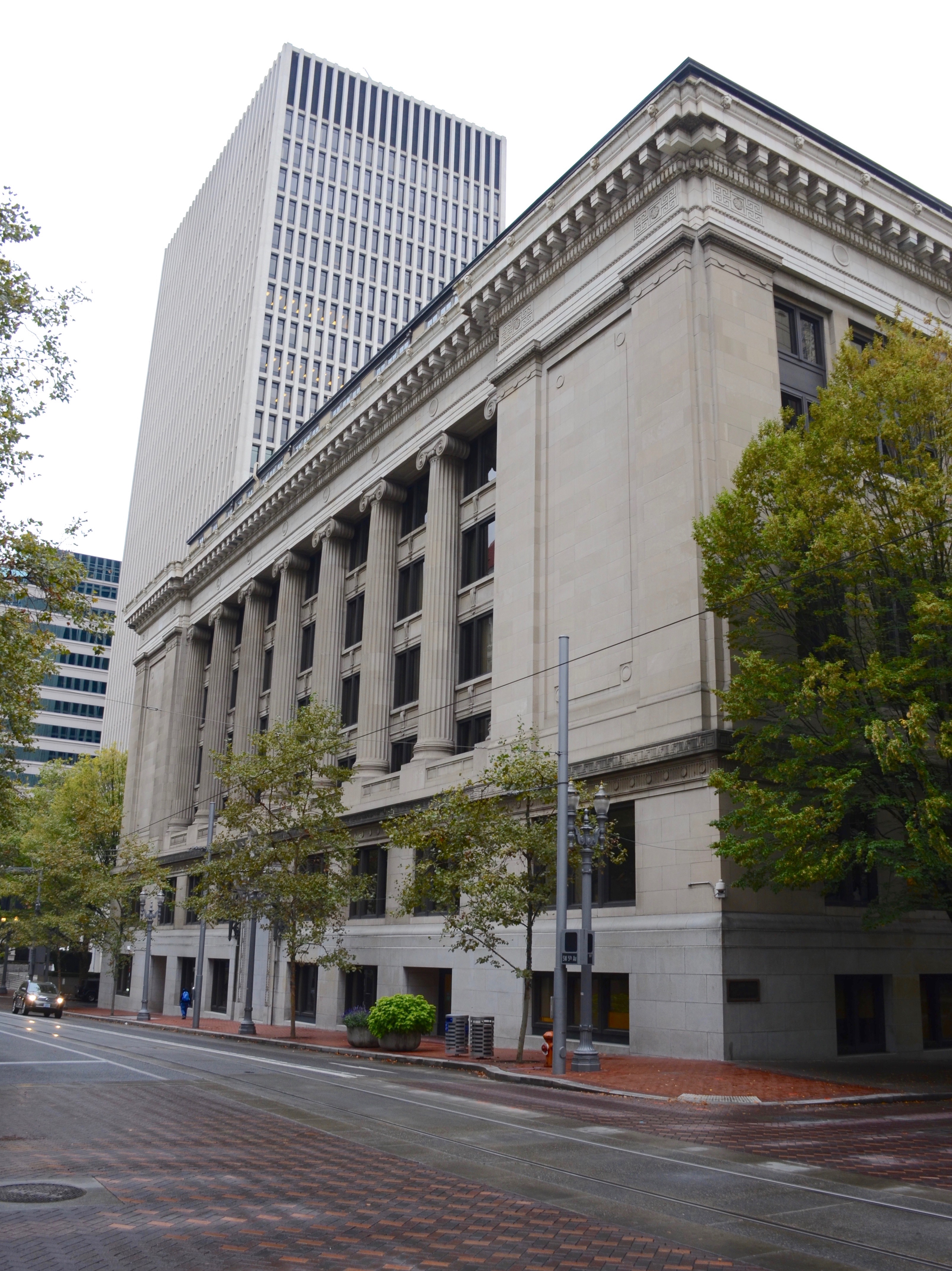
The building's 5th Avenue side, on the Portland Transit Mall

The Multnomah County Courthouse is a historic building that served as the courthouse for Multnomah County, Oregon from 1911 to 2020. It is located in downtown, Portland, Oregon, the county seat, and is listed on the National Register of Historic Places. Due to concerns over the structural deficiency of the then-century-old building, which was determined to need a costly seismic retrofit, the county board of commissioners decided in 2013 to launch plans to construct a new courthouse in a different location, to replace the existing building. Construction began in October 2016. The old courthouse closed on September 29, 2020, and the new courthouse opened on October 5. The old building was sold in 2018 to NBP Capital, which plans to convert it into a mixed-use development after making a seismic retrofit.

== History ==
The Multnomah County Courthouse was built in two phases between 1909 and 1914 at a total cost of $1.6 million; to make it fire-resistant, it was constructed of concrete-encased steel, with concrete slab floors and walls of terra-cotta brick, covered with plaster. At the time, it was the largest courthouse on the west coast and served also as county seat and county jail.

Originally, the building had a central courtyard, where prohibition-era confiscated alcohol was poured down a drain; over time, this courtyard was filled in to make room for more offices and a jury room. The courthouse had four two-story courtrooms which featured most of the courthouse's original design; some two-story courtrooms were split horizontally during the 1950s, expanding capacity and resulting in new floors.

Further renovation of the courthouse had been under consideration since at least 1970, with studies starting in the 1990s also considering building a new courthouse. It was placed on the National Register of Historic Places in 1979.

=== Replacement and closure as courthouse ===
A February 2001 earthquake exposed weaknesses in the building's structure. Plans for the addition of a new floor, the infill of the light well and a major seismic retrofit were considered, with costs estimated in 2011 to be between $176 million and $220 million. However, in March 2013, the county board of commissioners decided instead to work toward planning for the construction of a new courthouse building in a different location, to replace the existing building. A search for suitable sites for the new courthouse followed, and in April 2015 the county commission chose a site at the west end of the Hawthorne Bridge as the location for the planned new courthouse.

Construction began in October 2016. The last day of operation of the old courthouse was September 29, 2020, and the new building opened to the public on October 5, 2020. The new courthouse is 17 stories tall and has 44 courtrooms. It is located in the block bounded by First Avenue, Madison Street, Naito Parkway, and Jefferson Street, with its main (public) entrance located at the intersection of First and Madison.

=== Post-courthouse future ===
The county sold the old building to NBP Capital in November 2018. In 2020, it was reported that the company plans to carry out a seismic retrofit and convert the building for mixed use, but that details of the plans are not yet finalized.

== See also ==
- Architecture of Portland, Oregon
- List of Oregon's Most Endangered Places
- National Register of Historic Places listings in Southwest Portland, Oregon
