= Ashraf Habibullah =

Pakistani-American structural engineer and software developer

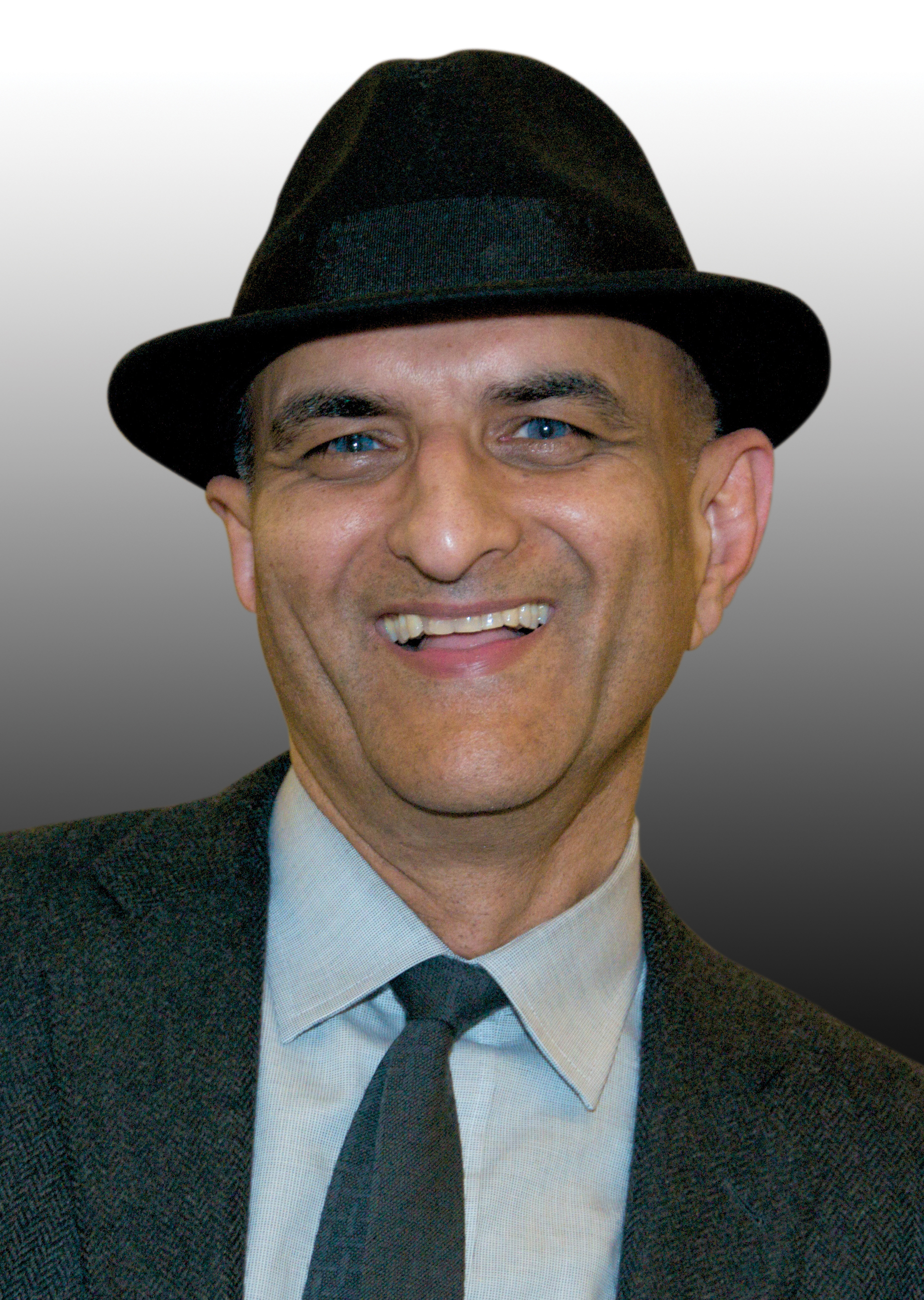
- Education: University of California, Berkeley (M.S. 1970), NED University of Engineering and Technology (B.S. 1969)
- Engineering career
- Discipline: Structural Engineering; Earthquake Engineering; Software
- Practice name: Computers and Structures, Inc. (Founder, President, and CEO)
- Significant advance: SAP2000; CSiBridge; ETABS; SAFE; PERFORM-3D; CSiCOL
- Awards: ATC-ENR Top Seismic Product of the 20th Century; SEAONC H. J. Brunnier Lifetime Achievement Award; ACI Charles S. Whitney Medal; SEAONC Community Involvement Award; ASCE George Winter Award; Contra Costa County Arts Recognition Award; San Francisco Business Arts Award for Outstanding Individual Contribution to the Arts Community; University of California, Berkeley Civil and Environment Engineering - Academy of Distinguished Alumni; University of California, Berkeley Foundation Trustees' Citation Award

Ashraf Habibullah is a Pakistani-American structural engineer and software developer. He earned his M.S. (1970) in Civil (Structural) Engineering from the University of California, Berkeley and B.S. (1969) in Civil Engineering from the NED University of Engineering and Technology, Pakistan. He is a licensed Civil Engineering and Structural Engineer in California. After earning his M.S., he worked at McClure and Messinger (1971-1973), and then Earthquake Engineering Systems (1974).

Habibullah founded Computers and Structures, Inc. (CSI) in Berkeley, California in 1975. He and Dr. Edward L. Wilson, a professor of structural engineering at University of California, Berkeley created ETABS, a building analysis and design software. ETABS received recognition as one of the Applied Technology Council and Engineering News-Record Top Seismic Products of the 20th Century.

== Awards and citations ==
- Elected a Member of the National Academy of Engineering (NAE) in 2024 "for structural engineering software for use by engineers globally and for advocacy of the engineering profession".
- Structural Engineers Association of Northern California H. J. Brunnier Lifetime Achievement Award (2010) for changing "the practice of structural engineering for the better with his development of efficient and usable structural analysis programs".
- American Society of Civil Engineers George Winter Award (2005) – in recognition of "leading the development of highly complex software for structural analysis and design and founding the Engineers Alliance for the Arts and the Diablo Ballet".
- American Concrete Institute Charles S. Whitney Medal awarded to Computers and Structures Inc. (2011) for computer applications that have changed and modernized structural engineering practice to a level never envisioned just a few decades ago.
- Structural Engineers Association of Northern California (SEAONC) Community Involvement Award (2003) for "enhancing the life safety, environmental health, and economic well-being of the public".
- University of California, Berkeley Foundation Trustees' Citation Award (2014) for his service in campus fundraising.
- ASCE Structural Engineering Institute President's Award (2017) in recognition of exemplary contributions to the success of SEI.
- San Francisco Business Arts Council Award (2004) for Outstanding Individual Contribution to the Arts Community.
- Contra Costs County Arts Council Award in recognition of significant contributions to the arts and culture of the country.
- Applied Technology Council Award for Top Seismic Product of the 20th Century (2006) for ETABS.
- Structural Engineers Association of Arizona President's Award.
- Inducted into University of California, Berkeley CEE Academy of Distinguished Alumni (2013) in recognition of a distinguished professional career and lifelong dedication, support and advancement of Berkeley CEE.
- Structural Engineers Association of Southern California Honorary member.
- Structural Engineers Association of Northern California Honorary member.
- Earthquake Engineering Research Institute Honorary member (2017).
- Keynote speaker at the 2019 Fall Commencement of California Polytechnic State University, in San Luis Obispo, California.

== Arts and culture ==
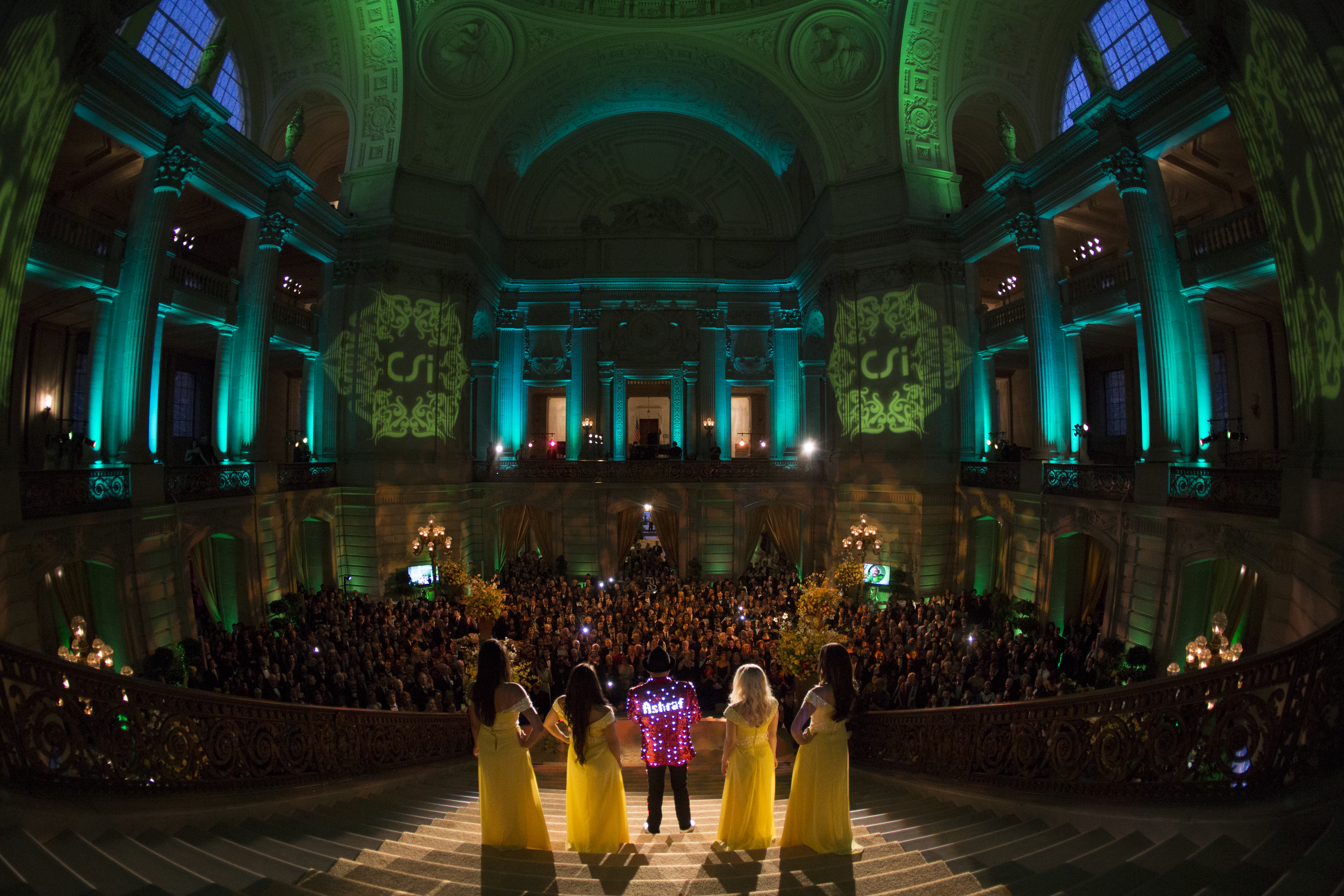
Ashraf Habibullah, S.E. addressing guests at Computers and Structures, Inc.'s 40th Anniversary Party, San Francisco City Hall Rotunda

Habibullah co-founded the Diablo Ballet in 1993 and was its main sponsor until his departure in March 2007. He also founded the Engineer’s Alliance for the Arts, an organization that involves school children with technology, focusing on the artistic aspects of bridge engineering, in 1997. He also received the 1998 Arts Recognition Award from the Arts and Culture Commission of Contra Costa County for Diablo Ballet and the American Society of Civil Engineers (ASCE) George Winter Award in 2005. for "commitment to the social and artistic needs of the community",

For his involvement with both Diablo Ballet and the Engineers' Alliance for the Arts, Habibullah received the San Francisco Business Arts Award for Outstanding Individual Contribution to the Arts Community in 2004.
