= Robert Alan Olson =

American applied political Scientist (born 1938)

Robert A. Olson
- Born: March 10, 1938; Oakland, California
- Education: University of California, Berkeley, University of Oregon
- Known for: First Executive Director of the Alfred E. Alquist Seismic Safety Commission, Seismic risk reduction policy
- Spouse: Natalie Elizabeth Franks
- Parent(s): Dorothy Evelyn Juergens, Reynold Frederick Olson
- Relatives: Richard S. Olson
- Awards: Alfred E. Alquist Special Recognition Medal (Previously called the EERI Special Recognition Award)

Robert A. Olson (born 1938) is an American applied political scientist and a leader in establishing and implementing public policies for the reduction of earthquake risk.

Early in his career, Olson worked as a regional representative for the U.S. Office of Emergency Preparedness, following which he served as assistant director of the Metropolitan Transportation Commission for the San Francisco Bay Area. When the Alfred E. Alquist Seismic Safety Commission (SSC) was formed in 1975, Olson was appointed as the first executive director. As SSC executive director from 1975 to 1982, he was instrumental in authoring and advocating for important legislation such as the Hospital Facilities Seismic Safety Act and Dam Failure Inundation Mapping Act.

After leaving the SSC, Olson established Robert Olson Associates, which provided services to public, private, and nonprofit clients on a wide range of planning, risk reduction, and business recovery projects. Olson has conducted post-earthquake investigations and consulted for government agencies following numerous major earthquakes, and has authored or co-authored over 40 articles and publications related to earthquake safety.

== Early life and education ==
Olson was born in Oakland, California, to Dorothy Evelyn Juergens and Reynold Frederick Olson. He graduated from Oakland High School in 1956. After attending Oakland Junior College for one semester, he enrolled in University of California, Berkeley where he earned a BA in political science in 1960. Upon graduating from UC Berkeley, Olson married Natalie Elizabeth Franks and joined the U.S. Army. He was stationed in Fort Hood, Texas, and assigned to Company A, Second Medium Tank Battalion, 35th Armored Regiment, Second Armored Division.

In 1964 he earned an MA in political science from University of Oregon. During his master's work at U. Oregon, he became interested in national security policy and published his first journal article on the subject.

== Early career ==
In 1963, Olson took a management intern position in Washington, D.C., in the Office of Emergency Planning (OEP) in the Executive Office of the President. In 1965, he was assigned to the OEP Regional Office in Santa Rosa. His first experience with field inspection after an earthquake occurred after the 1969 Santa Rosa earthquake. In conjunction with Frank E. McClure and Karl Steinbrugge, Olson designed a questionnaire that was published in the Santa Rosa Press Democrat to collect data on damage to residents' properties. When the 1971 San Fernando earthquake occurred, Olson worked with Robert Denton to evaluate search and rescue operations, mental health effect, and various organizational aspect of the earthquake.

Olson joined the staff of the newly formed San Francisco Bay Area Metropolitan Transportation Commission (MTC) 1972. The MTC was created to prepare a multi-modal transportation plan of the nine-county San Francisco Bay Area. He became the assistant director for administration and special projects, and then left in 1975 to become the executive director of the Seismic Safety Commission.

== Alfred E. Alquist Seismic Safety Commission ==
The Alfred E. Alquist Safety Commission (SSC) is an outgrowth of two committees: (1) the Alquist Joint Committee on Seismic Safety created by the California State Legislature in 1969, and (2) the Governor’s Earthquake Council created by Governor Ronald Reagan in 1972. The Seismic Safety Act, Senate Bill 1729, authored by State Senator Alfred Alquist, and signed into law by Governor Reagan established the commission for a two-year period. The SSC Mission is "To provide decision makers and the general public with cost-effective recommendations to reduce earthquake losses and expedite recovery from damaging earthquakes."

The commission officially began January 1, 1975; however, the first commissioners were not appointed until May 1975 by then governor Jerry Brown. The first SSC chair was Karl Steinbrugge. At its first meeting in May 1975, the SSC selected Robert A. Olson at the first executive director.

Executive directors of the CSSC
Person	Years of service
Lori Nezhura (interim)	February 2025-
Annde Ewertsen	October 2022-January 2025
Richard McCarthy	July 1995-December 2021
L. Thomas Tobin	February 1985-July 1995
Richard Andrews	March 1982-February 1985
Robert A. Olson	May 1975-March 1982

Soon after the SSC was established, the 1975 Oroville earthquake occurred on August 1, which increased interest in the seismicity of the Sierra foothills and the proposed Auburn Dam on the North Fork of the American River. In response, the SSC held a series of hearings regarding the Auburn Dam. Other issues that the SSC dealt with during Olson's tenure as executive director included hearings about the proposed Warm Springs Dam (1977), a resolution on the Palmdale Bulge (1976), hearings on damage to the facilities at the Lawrence Livermore National Laboratory in the 1980 Livermore earthquake. establishment of the Southern California Earthquake Preparedness Project (SCEPP) (1980), and working to make the SSC a permanent advisory body.

During Olson's term as executive director from 1975 to 1982, the SSC was instrumental in supporting the development and passing of legislation to increase seismic safety. A few are listed below:

- Establishment of the Highway Emergency Fund (AB 387, Davis) which provides assistance to local jurisdictions for repair or replacement of highways damaged by earthquakes.
- Required the SSC to conduct a study to determine the feasibility of establishing a comprehensive program of earthquake hazard reduction and earthquake prediction (SB 1279, Alquist)
- Establishment of the Southern California Earthquake Preparedness Project (AB 2202, Valencia)
- Authorized local governments to adopt ordinances requiring earthquake gas shut-off valves in buildings open to the public (AB 2438, Wray)
- Required the Department of Housing and Community Development to administer a program requiring bracing devices on mobile homes, to test the devices, and issue certifications (SB 360, Alquist)
- Amended the Hospital Seismic Safety Act to require the Office of Statewide Health Planning and Development to institute nonstructural plan reviews and field inspections of hospital buildings being constructed to ensure building safety (SB 961, Alquist)

== Learning from earthquakes ==
Olson has participated in multiple earthquake reconnaissance teams, where he studied social impacts from damaging earthquakes. He and his brother, Richard S. Olson, were part of a team organized by the Natural Hazards Assessment Project at University of Colorado that studied the 1972 Managua earthquake. He also visited the 1976 Guatemala earthquake with his brother, the 1986 San Salvador earthquake as a member of an Earthquake Engineering Research Institute (EERI) reconnaissance team during a brief truce in the Salvadoran Civil War, and the 1987 Whittier Narrows earthquake also as a member of an EERI reconnaissance team.

In collaboration with Richard S. Olson, he studied the politics of decision making in the aftermath of the damaging 1975 Oroville earthquake. With Richard S. Olson and Karl Steinbrugge, he studied the social and economic impacts of the 1981 Lima, Peru earthquake prediction. The predicted earthquake did not occur, which resulted in millions of dollars in losses due to impacts such as drops in property values, the sale and underwriting of earthquake insurance, and tourism trends.

His book, Some Buildings Just Can’t Dance: Politics, Life Safety, and Disaster, explores challenges and policy issues the City of Oakland faced in addressing damaged and destroyed buildings after the 1989 Loma Prieta earthquake. He evaluated hospital evacuations in the 1994 Northridge earthquake

== Robert Olson Associates ==
Olson established Robert Olson Associates (ROA) in 1981, which performed consulting and research projects until 2012. Clients included government agencies; educational and research institutions; private clients; foreign and international organizations; Native American tribes; medical services providers; self-governing special districts; and multi-county regional agencies. Some selected projects are listed below:

- Lake Isabella Dam Failure Evacuation Plan
- Evaluation of translation of earthquake engineering research into practice as part of the CUREE-Kajima Multi-Year “Long Road” Project
- Hazard mitigation plans for various municipalities to meet FEMA requirements
- Analysis of performance of the water system and the response of the East Bay Municipal Utility District to the Oakland firestorm of 1991
- Independent review of the Foothill Communities Law and Justice Center (FCLJC) in San Bernardino County, the first building in the U.S. to use base isolation

== Professional contributions and awards ==
- Alfred E. Alquist Special Recognition Medal (2001)
- Outstanding Paper, Earthquake Spectra (2003)
- Earthquake Engineering Research Institute Honorary Member
- National Research Council’s Committee on Disaster Research in the Social Sciences, member
