= James L. Stratta =

American structural engineer (1920-1994)

- Born: September 1, 1920; Berkeley, California, U.S.
- Died: April 23, 1994 (aged 73); Menlo Park, California
- Education: University of California, Berkeley
- Spouse: Velma Rozetta Corbin Stratta (1919-2013)
- Engineering career
- Discipline: structural engineering, earthquake engineering
- Practice name: Simpson, Stratta and Associates
- Awards: Nominated as candidate for Engineering News Record (ENR) Construction-Man-of-the-Year 1979

James Louis Stratta (September 1, 1920 - April 23,1994) was an American structural engineer in the San Francisco Bay Area, California, noted for his contributions to earthquake engineering and forensic engineering. Together with Albert T. Simpson, formed Simpson, Stratta and Associates in 1952, which was responsible for large-scale office parks, commercial buildings, and industrial facilities. In 1978 Stratta became an independent forensic consultant, where he worked on the 1978 Hartford Civic Center roof collapse and the 1979 Kemper Arena roof collapse. From 1952 to 1955 he taught courses on structural and seismic design in the School of Architecture at University of California, Berkeley. He served as president of the Structural Engineers Association of Northern California (SEAONC) in 1962.

== Early life ==
James Stratta was born on September 1, 1920, in Berkeley, California, the son of Irene and Emilio Stratta, who had immigrated from Italy in 1920. He grew up in the North Beach section of San Francisco, attending Galileo High School, from which he graduated in 1938. He attended junior college in San Francisco and transferred to University of California, Berkeley in 1940, earning a BS Civil Engineering in 1943.

== Early career ==
After graduation, he enlisted in the U.S. Navy and was stationed at Ames Naval Air Station, at Moffett Field in California from 1943 to 1946. At Ames, he worked on the drafting and design of large hangars and wind tunnels. He worked on the 40 by 80 ft (12 by 24 m) wind tunnel, which at that time was the largest wind tunnel in the world. From 1946 to 1947 Stratta worked for Erbentraut & Summers, a contracting firm.

In 1947, he joined the structural engineering firm run by Frederic F. Hall and Michael V. Pregnoff (Hall and Pregnoff) in San Francisco, where he was tutored by Pregnoff in the principles of seismic design. In 1952, Stratta and Simpson left Hall and Pregnoff to form their own firm.

== Simpson, Stratta and Associates ==
The firm started as Simpson & Stratta in 1952, primarily as a structural engineering firm. It evolved into an architectural and engineering firm and became Simpson, Stratta and Associates. It closed in 1978 after Simpson died in the St. Francis Yacht Club fire. In the early 1960s, the firm employed approximately 35 people.

Simpson & Stratta primarily was responsible for large-scale office parks, commercial buildings, and industrial facilities in the San Francisco Bay Area. Simpson, Stratta and Associates also completed city planning projects. Projects include:

- Utah Construction & Mining Company, South San Francisco Industrial Park, CA (1961)
- Comstock Apartments, Jones Street, San Francisco, CA (1961)
- General Mills western operations headquarters, South San Francisco, CA (1962)
- Alec Membership Shopping Center, Palo Alto, CA (1962)
- Signetics Corporation Complex, Sunnyvale, CA (1964)
- Design of Master Plan for the City of Folsom, CA (1964)
- Del Monte Center Monterey, CA (1967)
- National Semiconductor Company headquarters, Santa Clara, CA (1969)
- Intel's first company-owned building (SC1 Headquarters Building) at 3065 Bowers Avenue, Santa Clara, CA (1970)

== Forensic Engineering ==
From 1978 to 1988, James Stratta Consulting was involved with 100+ forensic engineering investigations, where he served as an expert witness when structural failures occurred. High profile projects that he worked on include the 1978 Hartford Civic Center roof collapse, the 1979 failure and collapse of the Kemper Arena (Note: "Failed Bolt Connections Bring Down Arena Roof". Engineering News Record. 202 (24): 10–13. 1979. This article has an inset titled “James L. Stratta: Failures Investigator” that introduces Stratta’s background and describes how he plans to do his investigation of the Kemper roof failure, including that he may conduct wind tunnel tests of a model of the arena using NASA facilities at Moffett Field.), and the Kansas City Hyatt Regency walkway collapse in 1981.

== Earthquake Reconnaissance and Seismic Design ==
Stratta visited numerous earthquake sites to observe the damage and provide expert input on the causes of failure and lessons learned to improve future performance. Examples include the 1964 Alaska earthquake; 1968 Manila, Philippines earthquake; 1976 Mindanao, Philippines earthquake; 1970 Ancash, Peru earthquake; 1974 Lima, Peru earthquake; 1976 Venezia-Giulia (Friuli), Italy earthquake; 1980 Campania-Basilicata, Italy earthquake; 1980 Greenville (Diablo-Livermore), California earthquake; and 1983 Coalinga, California earthquake.

Stratta's textbook, Manual of Seismic Design (1987), opens with a 46-page chapter on earthquake damage, consisting of photographs and brief analyses of building damage in 13 earthquakes occurring over a 21-year period, 1964-1985. These include the 1964 Alaska earthquake, the 1970 and 1974 earthquakes in Peru, the 1976 and 1980 earthquakes in Italy, the 1968 and 1976 earthquakes in the Philippines, five California earthquakes in 1971, 1979, 1980, 1983, and 1984, and the 1985 earthquake that caused extensive damage in Mexico City.

== Professional Activities and Awards ==
Stratta was active in the Structural Engineers Association of California (SEAOC), serving as director (secretary-treasurer) from 1952-1954. He served as President of the Structural Engineers Association of Northern California (SEAONC) in 1962. As a SEAOC/SEAONC member, he served on seismic design code development committees.

He served as president of the Consulting Engineers Association of California (CEAC) in 1967, and served on the board of directors of the American Consulting Engineers Council (ACEC). While serving as president of CEAC, he worked with California State Senator Donald L. Grunsky of Watsonville, on Senate Bill 411, the “anti-frivolous suits” bill, which was signed by California Governor Ronald Reagan on June 26, 1967.

Stratta was a consultant on the Applied Technology Council (ATC), which is a non-profit organization set up by SEAOC to do research and technology transfer on structural engineering issues. He worked on the ATC-3 project, Tentative Provisions for the Development of Seismic Regulations for Buildings. His focus was on ductile concrete frames and shear walls, and he completed a National Science Foundation funded research project entitled Seismic Resistance of Reinforced Concrete Shear Walls and Frame Joints: Implications of Recent Research for Design Engineers. He later served on the ATC board of directors (1975-1979).

In 1979, Engineering News Record (ENR) nominated Stratta as a candidate for Construction-Man-of-the-Year. (Note: "Those who made marks in 1979". Engineering News Record. 204 (1): 72. 1980. The list of Construction-Man-of-the-Year nominees is found in the January 3, 1980 issue of Engineering News Record. Stratta’s citation reads “Consulting Engineer James L. Stratta, probing the Kemper Arena failure in Kansas City and finding the bolts that failed.” Two other earthquake engineers, Henry J. Degenkolb and Egor P. Popov also were nominated in 1979 for their work in “developing eccentric bracing to prevent total failure of building frames in earthquakes.”.)
