= Robert Olson =

Robert Olson or Olsen may refer to:

- Robert A. Olson (1917–1987), American soil scientist and educator
- Robert Alan Olson (born 1938), American applied political scientist
- Robert E. Olson (1919–2011), American nutrition scientist and physician
- Robert W. Olson (1920–2013), Seventh-day Adventist theologian
- Robert S. Olson (born 1969), Republican member of the Kansas Senate
- Lute Olson (Robert Luther Olson, 1934–2020), American basketball coach

== See also ==
- Bob Olson (born 1948), American gridiron football player
- Bob Olsen (1884–1956), American science fiction writer
- Robert Olsson (1883–1954), Swedish hammer thrower
