= McClure (surname) =

McClure is a surname with several origins. One origin of the name is from the Scottish Gaelic MacGilleUidhir, and Irish Mac Giolla Uidhir, which means "son of the pale one" or "son of the cold one". Another origin of the name is from the Scottish Gaelic MacGilleDheòradha, and the Irish Mac Giolla Dheóradha, which means "son of the servant of the pilgrim". In the Scottish clan system, McClures are a sept of Clan MacLeod (of Dunvegan).

== People with the surname McClure ==
- Adele McClure, American politician from Virginia
- Alexander McClure (1828–1909), American politician, newspaper editor and writer from Pennsylvania
- Bob McClure (born 1952), American baseball pitcher and coach
- Billy McClure (William McClure) (born 1958), New Zealand football player
- Brian McClure (born 1963), American football player
- Bryton McClure (born 1986), American actor
- Charles L. McClure, American pilot who flew in the Doolittle Raid
- Charles McClure (1804–1846), American politician from Pennsylvania
- Daphne McClure (born 1930), British artist
- David McClure (1926–1998), Scottish artist and lecturer
- Doug McClure (1935–1995), American actor
- Duncan McClure (1913–1991), Scottish footballer
- Elliott McClure (1910–1998), American ornithologist
- Eric McClure (1978–2021), American race car driver
- Frank E. McClure (1924–2004) American structural engineer
- Floyd Alonzo McClure (1897–1970), American botanist
- Gary McClure (born 1964), American baseball coach
- George Buchanan McClure (1851–1888), Scottish rugby player
- Hannah McClure, American singer, The McClures
- Jake McClure, (1903–1940), American rancher and rodeo cowboy
- James A. McClure (1924–2011), American politician from Idaho
- James H. McClure (1939–2006), British/South African journalist
- Jennifer Moberly, née McClure (born 1962), American cleric and theologian based at Durham University, England
- Jessica McClure (born 1986), American who was rescued from a well
- John McClure (disambiguation), several people
- Sir John William Maclure, 1st Baronet (1835–1901), British politician
- Julie McClure, American politician
- Kandyse McClure (born 1980), South-African and Canadian actress
- Laura McClure (born 1985), New Zealand politician
- Laura McClure (singer), English singer
- Leonard McClure, (1835–1867), Irish-Canadian politician and printer
- Leslie Thompson McClure (1908–1966), Australian pie maker and caterer, see Four'n Twenty
- Louise Burton McClure (1916–1997), Canadian-born Israeli artist and designer
- Marc McClure (born 1957), American actor
- Mark Maclure (born 1955), Australian footballer
- Matt McClure (born 1981), American journalist and actor
- Matt McClure (born 1991), Northern Irish footballer
- Michael McClure (1932–2020), American poet
- Mike McClure (born 1971), American singer/songwriter/producer
- Molly McClure (1919–2008), American actress
- Nikki McClure, American artist
- Patrick McClure AO (born 1948), Australian CEO and social policy advisor to government
- Paul McClure, American singer, The McClures
- Robert McClure (1807–1873), Irish arctic explorer, 1850 expedition
- Robert Baird McClure (1900–1991), Canadian physician and clergyman
- Robert Alexis McClure (1897–1957), Major General, American soldier and psychological warfare specialist SHAEF WWII, MAAG Iran. Son Robert Dugald McClure]]
- Robert Dugald McClure (1920-2014) USMA June 1943, Colonel USAF aviator, missileer
- Robert Douglas McClure (1952 -) USMA 1976, Major USA & USAF American soldier. Son of Robert Dugald McClure USA Infantry & USAF missileer
- Robert B. McClure (1896–1973), American soldier
- Ron McClure (born 1941), American jazz bassist
- Ruth Adrienne McClure, (1907–1947), American actress better known as Adrienne Ames
- Sammy McClure (1878–1906), English footballer
- S. S. McClure (1857–1949), American investigative journalist and founder of McClure's Magazine
- Steve McClure (climber) (born 1970), British rock climber
- Vicky McClure, British actress
- Wayne McClure (1942–2005), American football player
- Wilbert McClure (1938–2020), American boxer
- William Maclure (1763–1840), American geologist
- W. Don McClure (1906–1977), American missionary

== Fictional people with the surname McClure ==
- Troy McClure, from the American television series The Simpsons
- Fergal MacClure, fictional character in Monarch of the Glen
- J.J. McClure, Burt Reynolds's character in The Cannonball Run
- Candy McClure, fictional character in "Orphan X" novels by Greg Hurwitz"

== See also ==
- The McClures, an American Christian music duo
