= Frank E. McClure =

American structural engineer (1924–2004)

- Born: June 3, 1924; San Francisco, California
- Died: July 16, 2004 (aged 80); Orinda, California
- Education: University of California, Berkeley
- Spouse: Augusta Anne Clemens Tolles (1923–2007)
- Parent(s): Denny Hanks and Irma V. McClure
- Engineering career
- Discipline: structural engineering, earthquake engineering
- Practice name: Frank E. McClure Consulting Engineer (1955–1962); Frank E. McClure and David L. Messenger, Consulting Structural Engineers (1962–1975)
- Employer(s): University of California (1976–1978); Lawrence Berkeley Laboratory (1978–1991)
- Awards: EERI Honorary member; SEAONC Honorary member; U. S. Department of Energy Distinguished Associate Award

Frank E. McClure (1924–2004, California Structural Engineer License [SE] 649) was an American consulting structural engineer in the San Francisco Bay Area, California, noted for his contributions to earthquake engineering. He was the University Engineer for the University of California (1976–1978) and the Senior Structural Engineer for the Lawrence Berkeley Laboratory (1978–1991). Beginning with the 1952 Kern County earthquake he traveled to the sites of recent earthquakes investigating earthquake-damaged buildings to understand the behavior of structures under seismic loads. Two of his most influential works were Studies in Seismicity and Earthquake Damage Statistics (1969, with Karl Steinbrugge) and a 1973 study Performance of Single Family Dwellings in the San Fernando Earthquake of February 9, 1971. He served as president of the Earthquake Engineering Research Institute (EERI).

== Career ==
McClure earned his B.S. Civil Engineering, with a focus in structural engineering in 1944, from University of California, Berkeley. While at UC Berkeley he joined the V-12 Navy College Training Program. Upon graduation he was sent to the Civil Engineer Corps Officers School (CECOS) in Davisville, Rhode Island and became a commissioned Navy officer (Lt. j.g.). He served in World War II with the 101st Naval Construction Battalion, Civil Engineer Corps (Seabees) in Okinawa, Japan (1944–1946). His Seabee battalion worked on facilities for small boat harbors, sea plane facilities, and roads.

After WWII, McClure worked for several engineering firms (Soule Steel Company, Thomas F. Chase, George Jennings). At Thomas F. Chase (1947–1953), McClure's primary work was to complete the structural design on schools designed by the architectural client, Anderson and Simonds. McClure opened his own office in Oakland in 1955. Joined in 1962 by David Messenger, the firm became Frank E. McClure and David L. Messinger, Consulting Structural Engineers. McClure and Messinger (1962–1975) provided professional structural engineering design services, with a specialization in earthquake engineering for public, industrial and commercial buildings, schools, hospitals and building retrofit projects. In 1975 as a consultant to the University of California, he developed the University of California Seismic Safety Policy.

In 1976, he left private practice to become the University Engineer for the University of California. As University Engineer he oversaw projects on all 9 campuses and implemented the University of California Seismic Safety Policy.

In 1978, he became senior structural engineer for the Lawrence Berkeley National Laboratory, retiring in 1991.

== Learning From Earthquakes ==
McClure, on his own time, using his own resources, visited sites of damaging earthquakes and documented damage and losses to improve understanding of earthquake design and construction. Examples include the 1954 Eureka earthquake, 1964 Alaska earthquake, 1966 Parkfield earthquake, 1967 Caracas earthquake. 1969 Santa Rosa earthquake, 1971 San Fernando earthquake, 1975 Oroville earthquake, 1978 Santa Barbara earthquake, 1980 Livermore earthquake, 1985 Mexico City earthquake, 1987 Whittier Narrows earthquake and the 1989 Loma Prieta earthquake.

McClure took many of the photos for the 1952 Kern County earthquake report written by Henry J. Degenkolb.

== Professional activities and awards ==
McClure was an early member of EERI, serving as EERI Secretary (1969 -1976), Director (1977–1979), and President (1987–1988). He was elected as an EERI honorary member in 1989. He was also a member of the Structural Engineers Association of California (Director 1963–1964, 1966–1967), Structural Engineers Association of Northern California (honorary member, Seismology Committee 1957-1959), American Society of Civil Engineers, American Concrete Institute, Seismological Society of America, Consulting Engineers Association of California, and International Conference of Building Officials.

He served as a member of the Working Group for Natural Phenomena Criteria of the General Design Criteria Planning Board, and the Natural Phenomena Hazards Panel of the Natural Phenomena Hazards Project for the U. S. Department of Energy (1985–1991). In 1990, he received the U.S. Department of Energy's Distinguished Associate Award in recognition of his 46 years of work reducing seismic hazards and for his leadership in the field.

He served on the Committee on Earthquake Engineering for the National Research Council (United States) (1985-1988), the Seismology Code Development Committee for the International Conference of Building Officials, and the Field Act Advisory Board for the California Office of the State Architect.
