= Rankings of universities in Pakistan =

University rankings in Pakistan by HEC

This article presents an overview of university rankings in Pakistan. Within Pakistan, the Higher Education Commission (HEC) provides official rankings of higher education institutions (HEIs) nationally, based on a multitude of criteria. There are also various magazines, newspapers and international agencies/standards which provide rankings and analysis.

According to the 2015 HEI rankings released by the HEC, the top six universities in Pakistan were, in descending order: Quaid-i-Azam University, University of the Punjab (PU), National University of Sciences & Technology (NUST), University of Agriculture Faisalabad (UAF), Aga Khan University (AKU) and COMSATS Institute of Information Technology.

As of 2022, total 6 universities were ranked in top 1000 by QS World University Rankings: National University of Sciences & Technology (#334), Quaid-i-Azam University (#378), PIEAS (#398), LUMS (#651), University of The Punjab (#701) and UET, Lahore (#801), . In rankings for 2023, the number increased to 7, with the addition of NED University of Engineering and Technology (#801).

== National ==
Up to date, the HEC has published rankings for the years 2006, 2012, 2013, 2014 and most recently 2015. In addition to the top ten and general rankings, independent rankings are also provided for universities and institutes in the categories of agriculture and veterinary science; arts and design; business; engineering and technology; and medicine. The HEC ranking uses five criteria, all of which have specific weightings and are summed to give an aggregate score out of 100. Institutional rankings are determined based on this aggregate score. Each criterion and its weighting is dependent upon a set of sub-components. The five criteria, along with their weighted score and sub-components are summarized below:

- Quality assurance (15) – Standard of M.Phil., M.S. and PhD courses; eligibility criteria for faculty member appointments; plagiarism policy compliance; assessment of Quality Enhancement Cells (QECs) for internal quality assurance; international awards/honors attained by students; affiliation of coursework with national accreditation bodies e.g. NAEAC, NBEAC, NCEAC, PEC and PMDC; latest international rankings of the university/institute.
- Teaching quality (30) – Staff to student ratio; ratio of PhD faculty and full-time faculty; faculty training and recruitment; student enrollment ratio and selectivity; national and international awards/recognition attained by faculty members.
- Research (41) – Nationally and internationally registered patents, varieties, technologies, breeds and creative work; university industrial linkages through Offices of Research, Innovation and Commercialization (ORICs); ratio of PhD students and total PhD output per year; amount of external research grants obtained; amount of travel grants obtained by faculties for presentation of papers abroad; number of papers published in ISI Web of Science impact factor journals and HEC-recognized journals; citations per paper; university h-index; number of W and X category journals published; internet bandwidth and HEC Digital Library utilization; number of national and international conferences/seminars/workshops/symposia organized.
- Finance and facilities (10) – Ratio of non-salary expenditures in total budget; amount generated through own resources; amount of budget expended on research and libraries; computers available per student and faculty; number of books and resources in libraries; number of external scholarships received by students.
- Social integration/community development (4) – Community outreach programs and services; international collaborations and student exchange programs; number of international students enrolled and foreign faculty.

=== Top ten rankings ===
According to the 2023 HEC rankings, the following comprise the overall top ranking higher education institutions in the country.

Ranking	University	Score
1	Capital University of Science and Technology	95.01
2	COMSATS Institute of Information Technology	79.40
3	National University of Science and Technology	66.78
4	Pakistan Institute of Engineering and Applied Sciences	74.88
5	Lahore University of Management Sciences	60.69
6	Government College University, Lahore	68.00
7	Institute of Business Administration (IBA)	70.09
8	Bahauddin Zakariya University, Multan	66.78
9	Minhaj University, Lahore	65.98

=== Agriculture and veterinary science ===
Ranking	University	Score
1	University of Veterinary and Animal Sciences	
2	University of Agriculture (Peshawar)	62.85
3	Sindh Agriculture University	46.90
4	Lasbela University of Agriculture, Water and Marine Sciences	42.65

=== Arts and design ===
Ranking	University	Score
1	National College of Arts	100.00
2	Indus Valley School of Art and Architecture	82.53
3	Pifd	88

=== Business ===
According to the 2022 HEC rankings, the following comprise the top ranking business schools in the country.

1	Institute of Business Administration, Karachi	100.00
2	Lahore University of Management Sciences	98.70
3	University of The Punjab	96.00
4	Lahore School of Economics	76.91
5	Sukkur Institute of Business Administration	75.83
6	Shaheed Zulfikar Ali Bhutto Institute of Science and Technology	75.70
9	University of Central Punjab	67.34
10	Greenwich University	58.75
11	GIFT University	54.66
12	COMMECS Institute of Business and Emerging Sciences	41.79
13	Khadim Ali Shah Bukhari Institute of Technology	22.16
14	Institute of Management Sciences (Lahore)	25.39
15	Dadabhoy Institute of Higher Education	7.54

=== Computer Sciences (CS), Engineering and Information Technology (IT) ===
Rankings for Computer science and information technology Institutes are updated as of 2022.

Ranking	University	Score
1	National University of Computer and Emerging Sciences	99.00
2	National University of Sciences and Technology	95.00
3	COMSATS University Islamabad	80.00
4	University of Engineering & Technology, Lahore	75.00
5	Quaid-e-Azam University	60.00
6	Air University, Islamabad	50.00
7	NED	40.00

=== Engineering and technology ===
According to the 2024 HEC rankings, the following comprise the top ranking engineering universities in the country.

Ranking	University	Score
1	Ghulam Ishaq Khan Institute of Engineering Sciences and Technology	96.67
2	University of Central Punjab	80.54
3	NED University of Engineering and Technology	75.34
4	Pakistan Institute of Engineering and Applied Sciences	72.46
5	Air University	63.97
6	Dawood University of Engineering & Technology	58.88
7	University of Engineering and Technology (Lahore)	57.74
8	University of Engineering and Technology (Peshawar)	57.22
9	University of Engineering and Technology, Taxila	55.32
10	Government College University, Lahore	52.30
11	Institute of Space Technology	51.06
12	Balochistan University of Information Technology, Engineering and Management Sciences	48.60
13	Quaid-e-Awam University of Engineering, Science and Technology	45.78
14	Sarhad University of Science and Information Technology	45.08
15	HITEC University	45.01
16	CECOS University of Information Technology and Emerging Sciences	43.96
17	Balochistan University of Engineering and Technology	43.91
18	Government College University, Faisalabad	43.39
19	Minhaj University Lahore	42.48

=== Medicine ===
According to the 2022 HEC rankings, the following comprise the top ranking medical schools in the country.

Ranking	University	Score
1	Aga Khan University	100.00
2	National University of Medical Sciences	83.54
3	Dow University of Health Sciences	64.53
4	University of Health Sciences (Lahore)	61.62
5	Khyber Medical University	57.28
6	Jinnah Sindh Medical University	53.62
7	Bahria Medical and Dental University	51.99
8	Ziauddin University	50.56
9	Sindh Institute of Medical Sciences	43.64
10	Baqai Medical University	41.58
11	Shaheed Mohtarma Benazir Bhutto Medical University	37.03
12	Hamdard University	36.45
13	King Edward Medical University	32.25
14	King Hamad University of Nursing and Associated Medical Sciences	32.20

=== General Rankings ===
Ranking	University	Score
1	National University of Computer and Emerging Sciences	100.00
2	National University of Sciences and Technology	94.14
3	Lahore University of Management Sciences	93.23
4	University of the Punjab	80.21
5	Aga Khan University	78.98
6	Institute of Business Administration, Karachi	76.32
7	Ghulam Ishaq Khan Institute of Engineering Sciences and Technology	75.20
8	University of Engineering and Technology, Lahore	75.19
9	University of Lahore	71.26
10	National Defence University, Pakistan	70.52
11	NED University of Engineering and Technology	69.93
12	Allama Iqbal Medical College	68.47
13	University of Central Punjab	61.32
14	International Islamic University	59.92
15	Dawood University of Engineering & Technology	59.30
16	National University of Modern Languages	58.54
17	Government College University (Lahore)	57.98
18	University of Peshawar	56.67
19	Bahauddin Zakariya University	56.44
20	Islamia College University	52.02

Notes:

- Institutions not included in the HEC rankings include distance learning universities, military academies, universities chartered after the 30th of June 2010 and those institutions for which sufficient data is not available.
- Source: Higher Education Commission, as of 23 February 2016.

== International rankings ==
=== Quacquarelli Symonds (QS) ===
The QS World University Rankings is one of the most widely referenced international ranking systems. Pakistan is ranked 50th globally in terms of its higher education system's strength. Following is the list of 13 Universities which appeared in 2022 - 2023 edition of QS World University Rankings:

National ranking	World ranking	Asia ranking (2024)	Subject ranking/s (world) (2016)	University	Province
1	353	67	Computer science and information systems: 251–300; Electrical and electronic engineering: 301–350; Engineering and technology: 340	NUST	Islamabad
2	363	91	QS International Trade Rankings: 176–200 (Only One in Pakistan); RePEc: 2.43, Second Place nationally; 250	Lahore School of Economics	Lahore
3	390	189		PIEAS	Islamabad
4	601	116	Business and management studies: 251–300; Computer science and information systems: 401–450	LUMS	Punjab
5	801 – 1000	145		University of the Punjab	Punjab
6	801 – 1000	183	Electrical and electronic engineering: 251–300	UET, Lahore	Punjab
7	801 – 1000	197		University of Peshawar	Khyber Pakhtunkhwa
8	1001 – 1200	137	Computer science and information systems: 401–500	Virtual University of Pakistan	Islamabad
9	1001 – 1200	214	Agriculture and forestry: 51–100	University of Agriculture, Faisalabad	Punjab
10	1001 – 1200	301 – 350		The University of Lahore	Punjab
11	1201 – 1400	245		University of Karachi	Sindh
12	1201 – 1400	301 – 350		Bahauddin Zakariya University	Punjab
13	1201 – 1400	301 – 350		IIUI	Islamabad
—	—	183	Medicine: 301–400	Aga Khan University	Sindh

=== Research Papers in Economics/IDEAS ===
Research Papers in Economics (RePEc) ranks the top 25% institutions and schools/faculties in the field of economics research, using its IDEAS database. The database takes a number of factors into account, such as item citations, journals and working papers, authorship and field-based ranks. The database rankings are updated on a monthly basis. Provided below are the most recent country rankings for Pakistan:

Ranking	University	School or department
1	Pakistan Institute of Development Economics	Department of Econometrics and Statistics
2	Lahore School Of Economics	Centre for Research in Economics & Business
4	National University of Computer and Emerging Sciences	Department of Computer Sciences
5	Quaid-i-Azam University	School of Economics
6	Institute of Business Administration	—
7	Federal Urdu University	School of Economic Sciences
8	International Islamic University	International Institute of Islamic Economics
9	University of Karachi	Applied Economics Research Centre
10	Lahore University of Management Sciences	Department of Economics
11	University of the Punjab	Department of Economics
12	Iqra University	Research Centre
13	National University of Sciences and Technology	NUST Business School
14	University of Sargodha	Department of Economics
16	University of Karachi	Department of Economics

Notes:

- For the purpose of this article, non-academic institutions ranked in the database have been excluded from this list.
- Source: Pakistan rankings, RePEc/IDEAS as of March 2016.

=== Round University Ranking ===
The Round University Ranking, compiled by the RUR Ranking Agency in Russia in partnership with Thomson Reuters, ranks the top 750 universities based on standards of teaching, research, international diversity and financial sustainability. The following Pakistani universities are listed in the 2016 rankings:

Ranking	World ranking	University	Score	League	Dimensional rankings (world)
1	610	National University of Sciences and Technology	31.205	World League	Teaching: 482 (Copper League); Research: 639 (World League); International diversity: 427 (Copper League); Financial sustainability: 652 (World League)
2	627	NED University of Engineering and Technology	29.520	World League	Teaching: 515 (World League); Research: 635 (World League); International diversity: 466 (Copper League); Financial sustainability: 673 (World League)

- Source: Round University Rankings, as of 2016.

=== SCImago Institutions Rankings ===
The SCImago Institutions Rankings (SIR) are published by the SCImago Research Group, a Spanish academic research organisation. The rankings measure universities using indicators such as research, innovation and web visibility. Included below are the 19 Pakistani universities listed in these rankings and their positions in terms of the latter two indicators (as of 2021).

Innovative Knowledge	University	Technological Impact	University	Website	University	Inbound Links	University
1	University of Karachi	1	Bahauddin Zakariya University	1	University of the Punjab	1	Islamia University
2	University of Agriculture (Faisalabad)	2	University of Karachi	2	International Islamic University	2	Aga Khan University
3	COMSATS Institute of Information Technology	3	University of Sargodha	3	National University of Sciences and Technology	3	University of the Punjab
4	Bahauddin Zakariya University	4	National University of Sciences and Technology	4	Quaid-i-Azam University	4	Federal Urdu University
5	National University of Sciences and Technology	5	University of Agriculture (Faisalabad)	5	Aga Khan University	5	Bahauddin Zakariya University
6	Quaid-i-Azam University	6	University of Engineering and Technology (Lahore)	6	University of Peshawar	6	COMSATS Institute of Information Technology
7	University of the Punjab	7	COMSATS Institute of Information Technology	7	Dow University of Health Sciences	7	University of Peshawar
8	University of Sargodha	8	Government College University (Lahore)	8	Islamia University	8	Quaid-i-Azam University
9	Government College University (Lahore)	9	Islamia University	9	University of Engineering and Technology (Lahore)	9	University of Engineering and Technology (Lahore)
10	Islamia University	10	University of the Punjab	10	University of Sindh	10	University of Karachi
11	University of Engineering and Technology (Lahore)	11	Government College University (Faisalabad)	11	University of Agriculture (Faisalabad)	11	University of Veterinary and Animal Sciences
12	Aga Khan University	12	Quaid-i-Azam University	12	Government College University (Lahore)	12	International Islamic University
13	Government College University (Faisalabad)	13	University of Sindh	13	University of Veterinary and Animal Sciences	13	Government College University (Faisalabad)
14	University of Sindh	14	Aga Khan University	14	Abdul Wali Khan University	14	Government College University (Lahore)
15	Abdul Wali Khan University	15	Abdul Wali Khan University	15	Government College University (Faisalabad)	15	National University of Sciences and Technology
16	Dow University of Health Sciences	16	Dow University of Health Sciences	16	Bahauddin Zakariya University	16	University of Sindh
17	International Islamic University	17	International Islamic University	17	University of Karachi	17	University of Sargodha
18	University of Peshawar	18	University of Peshawar	18	Federal Urdu University	18	University of Agriculture (Faisalabad)
19	Dawood University of Engineering & Technology	19	Dawood University of Engineering & Technology	19	COMSATS Institute of Information Technology	19	Dow University of Health Sciences

Notes:

- Data for research rankings is not publicly available.
- Source: Innovative Knowledge rankings, Technological Impact rankings, Website rankings and Domain Inbound Links rankings for Pakistan, SCImago Institutions Rankings as of 2014.

=== Times Higher Education ===
The Times Higher Education World University Rankings is a prominent publication of university rankings, released by the UK-based Times Higher Education magazine. It includes overall, subject and reputation-wise rankings, 150 Under 50 rankings, as well as two regional rankings: Asia, and BRICS and Emerging Economies. In the 2015–2016 edition, the following ranks were applicable to Pakistani universities:

Ranking	World ranking	Asia ranking	BRICS & Emerging Economies ranking	150 Under 50 ranking	University
1	601–800	—	—	—	COMSATS Institute of Information Technology
2	601–800	121–130	132	101–150	National University of Sciences and Technology
3	601–800	101–110	107	—	Quaid-i-Azam University
4	601–800	—	—	—	Capital University of Science & Technology
5	801	—	—	—	University of Agriculture (Faisalabad)
6	801	—	—	—	Bahauddin Zakariya University
7	801	—	—	—	National University of Computer and Emerging Sciences
8	801	—	—	—	University of Lahore

Notes:

- The 150 Under 50 ranking lists the top 150 world universities which are less than 50 years old.
- Source: World rankings (as of 2016/2017), Asia rankings (as of 2016), BRICS & Emerging Economies rankings (as of 2015/2016) and 150 Under 50 rankings (as of 2016) for Pakistan, Times Higher Education World University Rankings.

=== UI GreenMetric Ranking ===
The GreenMetric Ranking of World Universities is published by Universitas Indonesia (UI). It ranks over 400 world universities according to their eco-friendly environment and commitment to sustainability. Three instruments are used as the basis of the ranking criteria: Environment, Economics and Equity. The 2015 edition includes the following overall and indicator-specific world rankings for Pakistani universities:

Ranking	University	Overall ranking	Setting & infrastructure	Energy & climate change	Waste	Water	Transportation	Education	Campus setting
1	University of Agriculture (Faisalabad)	128	92	165	322	148	56	34	Urban: 57
2	Pir Mehr Ali Shah Arid Agriculture University	220	253	327	291	101	201	95	Urban: 110
3	University of Lahore	270	154	270	356	394	92	204	Urban: 138
4	University of Karachi	355	60	339	397	291	262	336	Urban: 189
5	International Islamic University	392	293	382	406	282	287	226	City Center/High Rise: 53

- Source: Overall rankings, Setting and Infrastructure rankings, Energy and Climate Change rankings, Waste rankings, Water rankings, Transportation rankings, Education rankings and Campus Setting rankings, UI GreenMetric as of December 2015.

=== U-Multirank ===
U-Multirank is an independent ranking system funded by the European Commission under the Erasmus Programme. The ranking is supported by a consortium of academics in Europe. It provides multi-dimensional listings for universities, in terms of academic fields as well as various education-specific indicators. Universities are rated against these indicators using a grading system, ranging from 'A' (very good) to 'E' (weak). The 2016 rankings include the following Pakistani universities along with their grades:

Rank	University	Teaching & learning	Research	Knowledge transfer	International orientation	Regional engagement
1	University of Veterinary and Animal Sciences	Bachelors graduation rate: A; Masters graduation rate: A; Graduating on time (bachelor): A; Graduating on time (masters): A	Citation rate: D; Research publications: A; External research income: A	Co-publications with industrial partners: D; Private income: D; Patents: E; Publications cited in patents: E	International joint publications: D	Bachelor graduates working in region: D; Regional joint publications: B; Regional income sources: E
2	Institute of Management Sciences (Peshawar)	Graduating on time (bachelor): A; Graduating on time (masters): A	—	—	—	—
3	Balochistan University of Information Technology, Engineering and Management Sciences	Bachelors graduation rate: B; Masters graduation rate: C; Graduating on time (bachelor): B; Graduating on time (masters): C	Citation rate: D; Research publications: D; External research income: D	Co-publications with industrial partners: B; Private income: D; Patents: E; Publications cited in patents: E	Student mobility: D; International joint publications: A	Bachelor graduates working in region: B; Regional joint publications: B; Regional income sources: B

Notes:

- Source Pakistan rankings obtained from university comparisons, U-Multirank as of April 2016.

=== University Ranking by Academic Performance ===
The University Ranking by Academic Performance (URAP), developed at the Middle East Technical University in Turkey, ranks the top 2,000 global institutions with an emphasis on research impact and quality, and scientific productivity. It uses indicators such as articles published, citations, total documents, article and citation impact, and international collaboration. The 2015–2016 edition provides the following national, international and regional rankings along with field-based ranks (as of 2014–2015) for Pakistani universities:

Ranking	World ranking	Asia ranking	University	Field-based ranking/s (world)
1	315	9	Quaid-i-Azam University	Biological sciences: 772; Chemical sciences: 661; Engineering: 588; Mathematical sciences: 189; Medical and health sciences: 949; Physical sciences: 305; Information and computing sciences: 201
2	967	259	COMSATS Institute of Information Technology	Chemical sciences: 872; Engineering: 669; Information and computing sciences: 577; Mathematical sciences: 499; Physical sciences: 699
3	973	263	University of Agriculture (Faisalabad)	Agricultural and veterinary sciences: 167; Biological sciences: 625; Engineering: 1,015; Environmental sciences: 400
4	1,040	292	University of the Punjab	Biological sciences: 651; Engineering: 1,139; Mathematical sciences: 656; Medical and health sciences: 986; Physical sciences: 692
5	1,059	295	Aga Khan University	Medical and health sciences: 513
6	1,101	309	National University of Sciences and Technology	Engineering: 933; Mathematical sciences: 487; Physical sciences: 761
7	1,261	375	University of Karachi	Biological sciences: 777; Chemical sciences: 688; Medical and health sciences: 878
8	1,343	407	Bahauddin Zakariya University	Engineering: 1,224
9	1,403	435	Pakistan Institute of Engineering and Applied Sciences	Biological sciences: 995; Engineering: 1,061; Physical sciences: 932
10	1,475	464	Government College University (Faisalabad)	—
11	1,558	503	University of Peshawar	—
12	1,581	512	Government College University (Lahore)	Mathematical sciences: 871
13	1,646	533	University of Sargodha	—
14	1,701	561	Lahore University of Management Sciences	—
15	1,752	577	Pir Mehr Ali Shah Arid Agriculture University	—
16	1,890	641	University of Engineering and Technology (Lahore)	—
18	1,937	661	University of Sindh	—
19	1,968	670	Dow University of Health Sciences	—
20	1,975	673	Kohat University of Science and Technology	—

Notes:

- The 17th rank is intentionally omitted due to database error.
- Source: Pakistan rankings and Asia rankings (as of 2015–2016); Field-based rankings (as of 2014–2015), University Ranking by Academic Performance.

=== U.S. News & World Report ===
In the 2015 edition of top 500 international rankings, the U.S. News & World Report Best Global University Rankings listed the following Pakistani university:

Ranking	World ranking	Asia ranking	University
1	496	89	Quaid-i-Azam University

=== Webometrics ===
The Webometrics Ranking of World Universities, published by the Spanish Cybermetrics Lab, provides a listing of national, regional and international rankings of universities in Pakistan based on their web presence. Shown below, as per the 2016 edition, are the top 20 rankings only:

Ranking	World ranking	Asia ranking	South Asia ranking	University
1	1,801	509	24	University of the Punjab
2	1,818	518	27	National University of Sciences and Technology
3	1,866	533	30	COMSATS Institute of Information Technology
4	1,908	548	33	Aga Khan University
5	2,034	597	37	Quaid-i-Azam University
6	2,046	599	38	Islamia University
7	2,229	681	49	Lahore University of Management Sciences
8	2,437	767	59	University of Agriculture (Faisalabad)
9	2,630	843	73	International Islamic University
10	2,638	846	75	Allama Iqbal Open University
11	2,834	924	89	University of Engineering and Technology (Lahore)
12	2,989	979	102	Bahauddin Zakariya University
13	3,074	1,014	110	University of Karachi
14	3,233	1,074	117	Government College University (Lahore)
15	3,337	1,110	123	University of Peshawar
16	3,417	1,134	128	University of Sindh
17	3,459	1,147	131	National University of Computer and Emerging Sciences
18	3,883	1,309	166	NED University of Engineering and Technology
19	3,964	1,330	173	Government College University (Faisalabad)
20	4,113	1,385	183	Dawood University of Engineering & Technology

- Source: Pakistan rankings, Asia rankings and South Asia rankings, Webometrics as of January 2016.

=== uniRank ===
uniRank (unirank.org) ranks universities and colleges country-wise based on their web popularity and online footprint. It is not an academic ranking. According to its website, uniRank uses an algorithm including web metrics from Moz Domain Authority, Alexa Global Rank, SimilarWeb Global Rank, Majestic Referring Domains and Majestic Trust Flow. The top 10 results in Pakistan include the following universities:

Ranking	University
1	Quaid-i-Azam University
2	University of the Punjab
3	Aga Khan University
4	Lahore University of Management Sciences
5	COMSATS Institute of Information Technology
6	National University of Computer and Emerging Sciences
7	University of Agriculture (Faisalabad)
8	Bahauddin Zakariya University
9	University of Management and Technology
10	University of Gujrat

- Source: Pakistan rankings, uniRank as of 2016.

== Analysis and criticism ==
The HEC acknowledges that rankings are "a debatable subject all over the world". It defines its ranking system as a measure to strengthen the quality of higher education, provide a tool for self-assessment, as well as ensure that universities achieve domestic and international competitiveness in education, innovation and research. However, the HEC's rankings have been subject to criticism among educationists and policy-making experts in Pakistan. Some critics claim the rankings give "more weight to quantity than quality" of research, faculty and other key factors.

== See also ==
- List of universities in Pakistan
