= M. H. Panhwar =

Sindhi writer

- Born: Muhammad Hussain Panhwar; 25 December 1925; Ibrahim (Kachi), Dadu District, Sindh, British India
- Died: 21 April 2007 (aged 81); Sindh, Pakistan
- Occupations: Engineer, historian, writer, agriculturalist, archaeologist
- Known for: Work in Sindhology, groundwater research, agriculture, Sindh history
- Spouse: Farzana Panhwar
- Children: 4
- Awards: Sitara-i-Imtiaz (1992)
- Website: www.panhwar.com

Muhammad Hussain Panhwar (Sindhi: محمد حسين پنهور; 25 December 1925 – 21 April 2007), commonly known as M. H. Panhwar, was a Pakistani engineer, environmentalist, and a scholar of history, archaeology, anthropology, historical geography, and geology.

== Early life ==
He was born on 25 December 1925 in the village of Ibrahim (Kachi), Dadu District, Sindh, to Haji Khan, a poor farmer. He completed his primary education in his village and matriculated from Mehar. In 1949, he earned a B.E. in Mechanical and Electrical Engineering from NED College (now a university). Later, he was awarded a scholarship by the Government of Sindh to study in the United States and earned a master's degree in Agricultural Engineering from the University of Wisconsin.

== Career ==
Panhwar was a distinguished expert in environmental science, history, archaeology, anthropology, and geological studies. His expertise included groundwater development, earth moving, agricultural machinery, waterlogging, salinity control, drainage, and post-harvest agriculture. He worked as an agricultural engineer for the governments of Sindh and West Pakistan for four years, and later served as a superintending engineer for Sindh and Balochistan until 1969. He authored 10 books on groundwater in Sindh and numerous papers on the Thar and Kohistan regions.

In 1964, he established a horticultural farm focused on fruit crops, which was converted into a research station in 1985 to introduce new varieties adaptable to Sindh's climate. He wrote 36 books on agriculture and post-harvest processing. Considered a "one-man Sindhologist," Panhwar published over 500 pages covering diverse aspects of Sindh.

== Personal life ==
Farzana authored numerous publications and represented Pakistan at various international conferences.

In June 2003, Panhwar founded a trust for social welfare initiatives in Sindh. He donated his home, office, agricultural land, orchard, library, and other assets to the trust. Panhwar died on 21 April 2007.

== Recognition ==
- Sitara-e-Imtiaz by the President of Pakistan.
- Gold Medal from University of Sindh for securing top position in B.E. (Mechanical and Electrical), 1949.
- Included in "Who's Who" (1987–88)
- Lifetime Achievement Award (1999) for contributions in history and archaeology, awarded by Tarqi Pasand Party
- Lifetime Achievement Award (2002) for contributions in engineering and agriculture, awarded by Revivers
- Named Top Horticulturist of Pakistan (2004) by Khabreen, KisanTimes TV, and Chawla Group
- Lifetime Research on Sindh Award (2004), Sindh Graduates Association
- Lifetime Service to Agricultural Science Award (2004), Sindh Agriculture University

== Works ==
Panhwar authored 10 books on groundwater and many articles on Thar and Kohistan deserts. He also wrote 36 books on agriculture and post-harvest fruit handling.

- Panhwar, M. H. & Farzana, "Sustainable methods as applied to raising fruit crops", IOSHAR, Hyderabad and Sindh Society for Horticultural Science, Karachi, 1995
- Farzana Panhwar, "Flora of Thar and Kohistan Desert", J. Sindh Quarterly, Vol. XV, No. 3, 1988
- Farzana Panhwar, "New Resources for Oleochemical and Agrochemical Industry"
- M. H. Panhwar & Farzana, "Design of an Aquaculture Enterprise", J. Pak. Agri., Vol. VII, No. 10, Oct 1985
- Farzana Panhwar, "Anaerobic Digestion and Use of Its Residues in Agriculture", Mehran Univ. Res. J., Vol. 12, No. 3, July 1993, pp. 18–22
- Farzana & M. H. Panhwar, "Scope for Prawn Farming along Sindh Coast", J. Sci. Tech. and Development
- Farzana & M. H. Panhwar, "Samphire – An Edible Oil Crop for Sindh", DAWN Econ. & Business Review, May–June 1995
- Farzana & M. H. Panhwar, "Intellectual Property Rights Production", DAWN Econ. & Business Rev., Dec. 1995
- Farzana & M. H. Panhwar, "Flying Fox as New Agriculture Pest"
- Farzana & M. H. Panhwar, "Neem vs. Eucalyptus in Social Forestry of Pakistan"
- M. H. Panhwar & Farzana, "Scope for Prawn Farming along Sindh Coast", PIMA Magazine
- Sikandar Ali Arbani, Farzana & M. H. Panhwar, "Anaerobic Digestion and Its Agricultural Use", Mehran Univ.
- "Chiku or Sapodilla – The Neglected Fruit of Sindh", Newsletter of Sindh Society for Horticultural Science
- "World Rural Women's Day Celebrated in Hyderabad", Sindh Agriculture, Nov. 1997
- "Earthworms, Vermicasts and Vermiculture", Wildlife & Environment, Oct–Dec 1997, pp. 25–29

== Bibliography ==
- Thaheem, Aijaz Ali (2018). "M.H. Panhwar as a Historian". Pakistan Perspectives. 23 (1). University of Karachi: 145–163. ProQuest 2208643628.
- Baloach, Rafique (2020). "ایم. ايچ پنهور جو ادب ۽ تاريخ ۾ حصو: ھڪ تحقيقي جائزو" [Contribution of M.H. Panhwar in Literature and History: A Research Analysis]. Kalich Research Journal (in Sindhi). 6. University of Karachi: 49–64.
