= NED University of Engineering and Technology =

Public university in Karachi, Pakistan

Coordinates: 24.931792°N 67.112646°E

- Other name: NEDUET
- Former name: Prince of Wales Engineering College
- Type: Public
- Established: 1921
- Academic affiliations: Pakistan Engineering Council; Higher Education Commission (Pakistan); Washington Accord
- Vice-Chancellor: Professor Dr Muhammad Tufail
- Academic staff: 451
- Students: 12279
- Undergraduates: 9496
- Postgraduates: 2643
- Doctoral students: 122
- Location: Karachi-75270, Sindh, Pakistan
- Campus: Urban
- Campus size: 156 acres (63 ha)
- Colours: Blue, maroon, amber
- Website: www.neduet.edu.pk

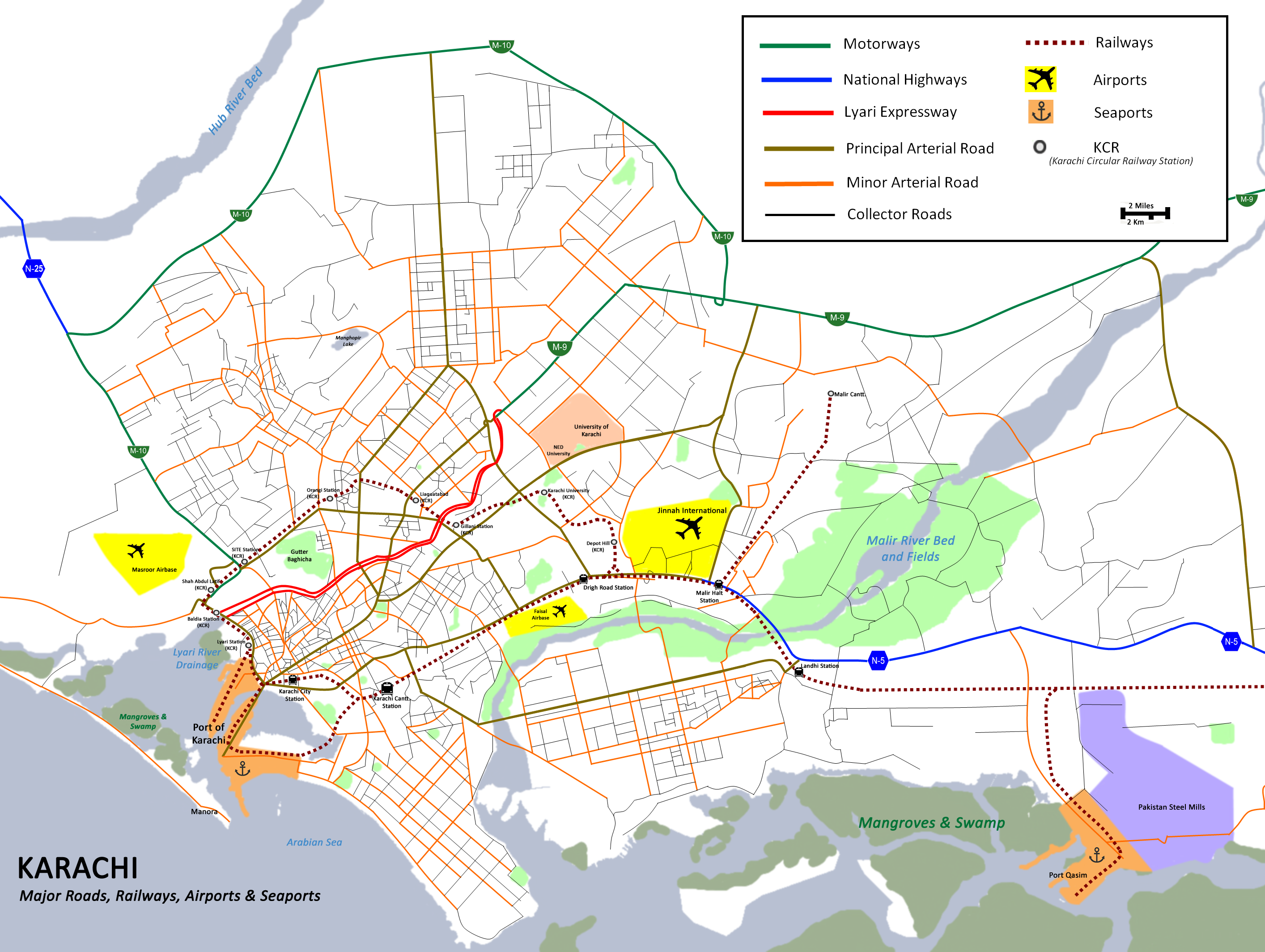
Location in Karachi

The NED University of Engineering and Technology is a public university located in the urban area of Karachi, Sindh, Pakistan. It is one of the oldest engineering universities in Pakistan, acknowledged for its best teaching practices and graduates.

Founded as Prince of Wales Engineering College, it was renamed after Parsi landowner and its benefactor Nadirshaw Edulji Dinshaw.

It is a recognised degree awarding university of Pakistan affiliated with the Higher Education Commission of Pakistan, a government-appointed body.

== History ==
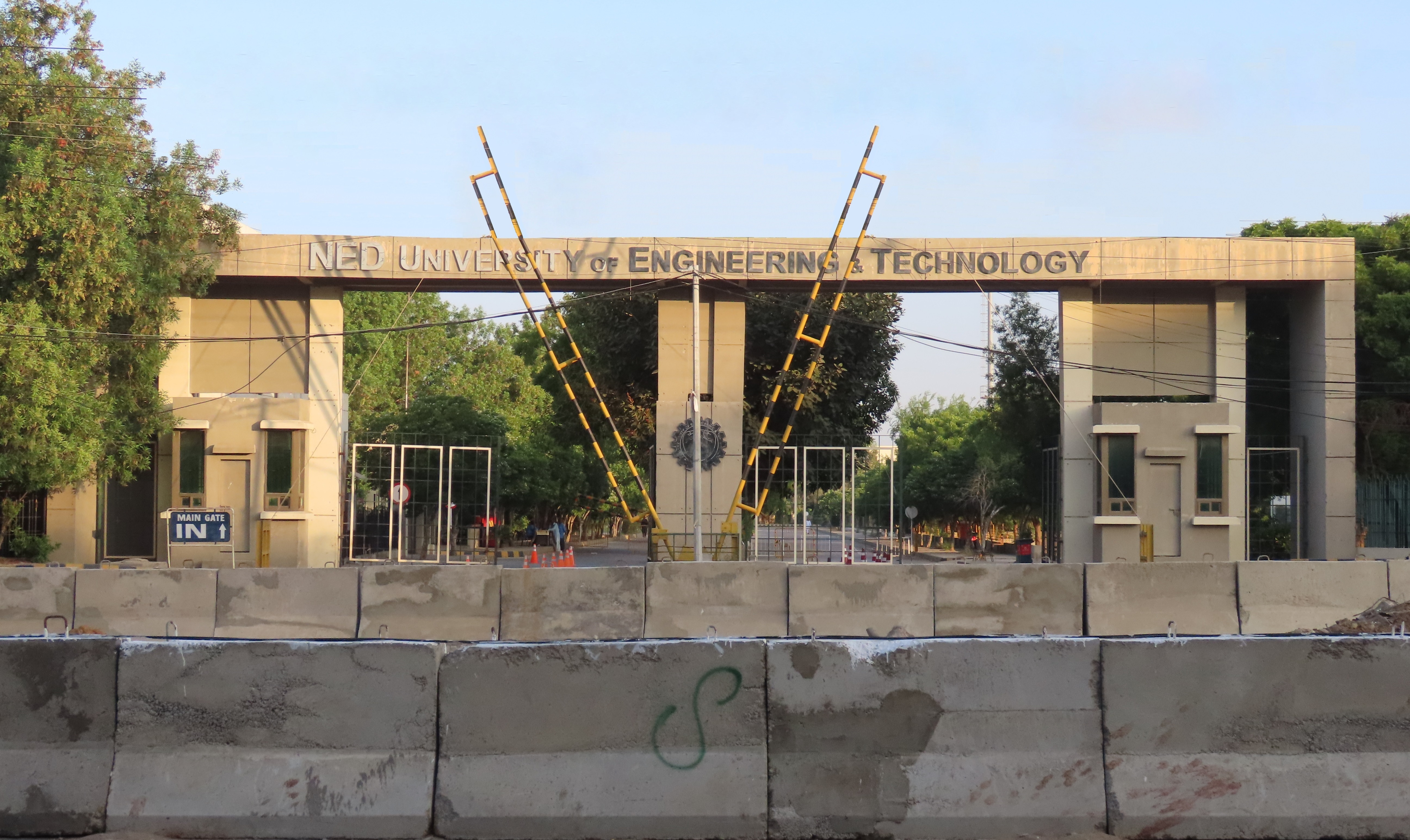
Main gate of the NED University of Engineering & Technology

=== Pre-Independence ===
Founded in 1921, as Prince of Wales Engineering College, to provide training to civil engineers working in building the Sukkur Barrage. In 1924, the college received donation of Rupees 150,000 from the heirs of Nadirshaw Edulji Dinshaw. As a result, the college was renamed to NED Government Engineering College. The NED College first remained associated with the University of Bombay (now known as the University of Mumbai) for many years during the British Empire until 1947.

=== Post-Independence ===
This university came to its modern form after being established by the British government and was taken over by the Government of Sindh in 1947. As Karachi continued to grow after the independence of Pakistan in 1947, and the old 'City Campus' became too crowded, a new 'Main Campus' was constructed on its present location on University Road, Karachi in 1975. The NED University of Engineering & Technology, was established on 1 March 1977 under an act of the Provincial Assembly of Sindh after upgrading of the former NED Government Engineering College, which was set up in 1921. The NED University is thus one of the oldest institution in Pakistan for teaching and producing Engineering graduates. Prior to this, the D.J.Sindh College, used to run classes to train subordinates for the Sindh PWD, the Municipalities and Local Boards. This university is named after its benefactor Nadirshaw Edulji Dinshaw.

== Campuses ==
The university is spread across four campuses; the main campus (Karachi), the city campus, the LEJ campus, and the Thar campus.

== Degree programmes offered ==
NED University offers different undergraduate, postgraduate, and PhD programmes. The university offers programmes in engineering, science, and architecture for undergraduate, postgraduate, and doctoral studies. In every year NED university also offers some courses for external students from Intermediate to onwards to enroll in some specially offered courses. For example, diploma, a Course in programming, or Artificial Intelligence. It is a member of Association of Commonwealth Universities of the United Kingdom.

== Faculties and departments ==
It is organised into following six faculties

=== Faculty of Civil and Petroleum Engineering (CPE) ===
The faculty of Civil and Petroleum Engineering comprises following departments.

- Department of Civil Engineering
- Department of Urban and Infrastructure Engineering
- Department of Petroleum Engineering
- Department of Earthquake Engineering

=== Faculty of Mechanical and Manufacturing Engineering (MME) ===
The faculty of Mechanical and Manufacturing Engineering comprises the following departments.

- Department of Mechanical Engineering
- Department of Textile Engineering
- Department of Industrial and Manufacturing Engineering
- Department of Automotive and Marine Engineering

=== Faculty of Electrical and Computer Engineering (ECE) ===
The faculty of Electrical and Computer Engineering comprises the following departments.

- Department of Electrical Engineering
- Department of Computer and Information Systems Engineering
- Department of Electronic Engineering
- Department of Telecommunications Engineering
- Department of Bio-Medical Engineering

=== Faculty of Information Sciences and Humanities (ISH) ===
The faculty * Department of Telecommunications Engineering of Information Sciences and Humanities comprises the following departments.

- Department of Software Engineering
- Department of Computer Science & Information Technology
- Department of Mathematics
- Department of Physics
- Department of Chemistry
- Department of Humanities

=== Faculty of Chemical and Process Engineering (CPE) ===
The faculty of Chemical and Process Engineering comprises the following departments.

- Department of Chemical Engineering
- Department of Materials Engineering
- Department of Metallurgical Engineering
- Department of Polymer and Petrochemical Engineering
- Department of Food Engineering
- Department of Environmental Engineering

=== Faculty of Architecture and Management Sciences (AMS) ===
The faculty of Architecture and Management Sciences comprises the following departments.

- Department of Architecture and Planning
- Department of Economics and Management Sciences

== Affiliated Colleges ==
- Government College of Technology (GCT)
- Institute of Industrial Electronics Engg. (IIEE)
- Institute of Aviation Technology, PAF
- PCSIR Pak Swiss Training Centre (PSTC)
- Karachi Tools, Dies & Moulds Centre
- Pakistan Marine Academy
- (formerly) Usman Institute of Technology
- College of Management Sciences

== NED Academy ==
To provide low-cost educational and professional training to existing professionals, NED University established the NED Academy. The academy has two sections:

- Centre for Continuing Engineering Education (CCEE),
- Centre for Multidisciplinary Postgraduate Programmes (CMPP).

=== CCEE ===
CCEE offers courses for Engineering, Information Technology, Management and Conversion Programmes. Short and long-duration courses are offered in these subjects. It s offered so that professionals, teachers, and students attain higher levels of research, information, and experience. It empowers them by boosting their skills, knowledge, and techniques. CCEE offers short courses to bring together new practitioners, and update engineering talent, technology, and opportunities for working engineers to improve the quality experience.

== Research ==
Although the main focus of the university had been on its teaching programmes, the university has started masters by Research and PhD programs. Different research groups and centres are also working in the university. The university publishes three research journals namely NED University Journal of Research, Journal of Social Sciences & Interdisciplinary Research, Journal of Research in Architecture & Planning.

== Vice-Chancellors ==
- Professor Dr Muhammad Tufail (2025 - Present)
- Sarosh Hashmat Lodi (2017-2025)
- A. M. Akhoond
- A. T. Khan
- Jameel Ahmed Khan
- Muhammad Munir Hasan
- A. Q. Qazi
- Abul Kalam
- M. Afzal Haque

== Memberships and Associations ==
- Asia Pacific Quality Network (APQN)
- Talloires Network (New)
- International Network for Quality Assurance Agencies in Higher Education (INQAAHE)
- Pakistan Network of Quality Assurance in Higher Education (PNQAHE)

== Notable alumni ==
- Mohammad Zahoor, Ukraine-based, British businessman – founder and owner of the ISTIL Group. (Also called as Steel Man).
- Ashraf Habibullah, co-creator of the first computer-based structural-engineering applications and Founder, President, and CEO of the structural-engineering software company Computers and Structures, Inc.
- Muhammad Hussain Panhwar: Pakistani scientist in the field of agriculture
- Khurram Murad: Pakistani Islamic scholar
- Rizwan Ahmed: Pakistan Administrative Service officer, NED University alumni
- Moiz Ullah Baig (International Scrabble player – Pakistan Scrabble Champion 2018 & World Junior Scrabble Champion 2018)
- Syed Murad Ali Shah: 29th and current chief minister of Sindh and a member of the Sindh Assembly.
- Elahi Bux Soomro: ex-Speaker of the National Assembly of Pakistan.
- Mohammad Aslam Uqaili: Vice-chancellor Mehran University of Engineering and Technology
- Saeed Anwar: international cricketer, former captain of Pakistan cricket team.
- Ali Haider: musician, singer and actor.
- Hafiz Naeem ur Rehman, Pakistani politician

== See also ==
- List of Islamic educational institutions
- List of universities in Karachi
- List of Universities in Pakistan
- Dawood University of Engineering and Technology
- Rankings of universities in Pakistan
- Higher Education Commission of Pakistan
- Pakistan Engineering Council

== Gallery ==
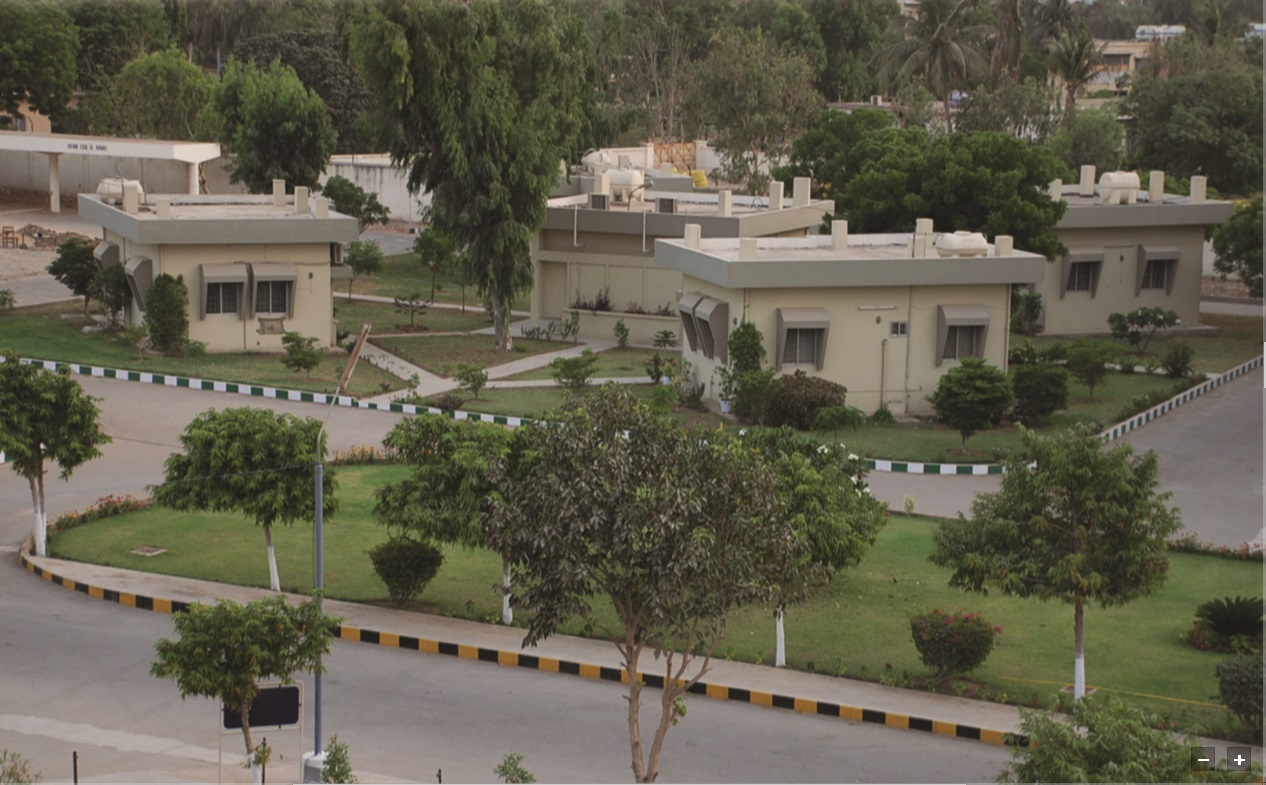

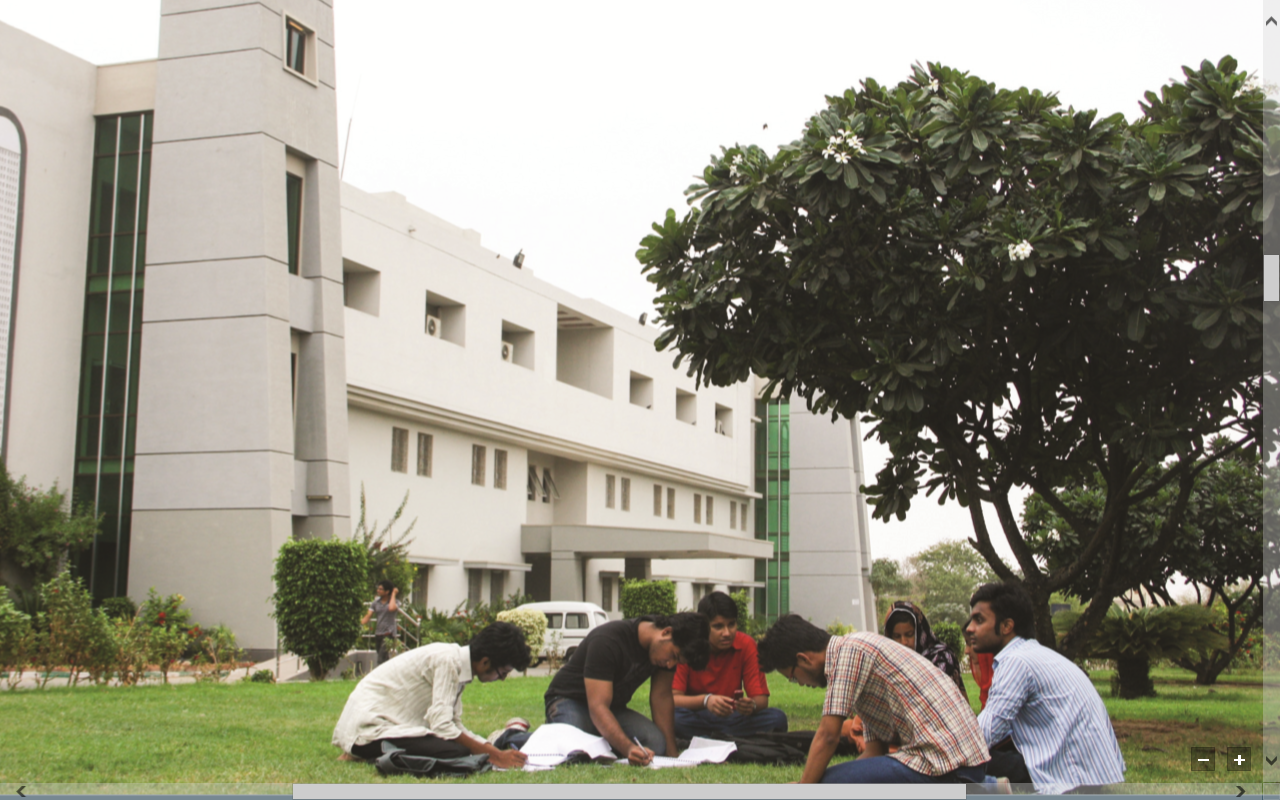

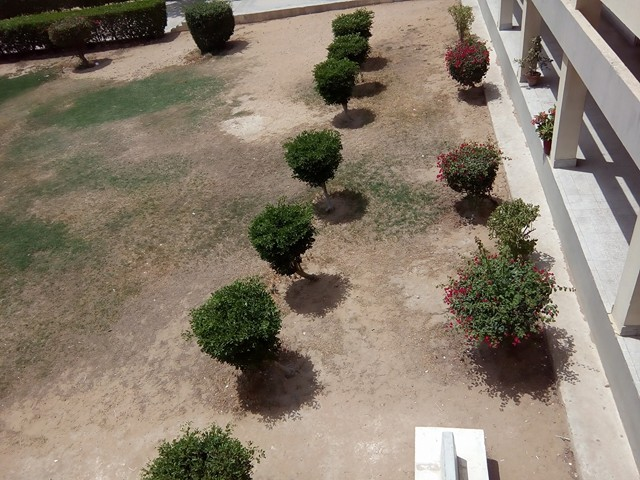
