= Uqaili =

Uqaili is a surname, with most members of the family currently residing in Sindh, the south eastern province of Pakistan. Notable people with the surname include:

- Abdul Aziz al-Uqaili (1919–1981), Iraqi regular military officer
- Allah Baksh Sarshar Uqaili (1907–1991), Pakistani poet
- Mohammad Aslam Uqaili, Pakistani engineer
- N. M. Uqaili, Pakistani politician
