= Computers and Structures (company) =

American engineering software company

Computers and Structures, Inc.
- Industry: Structural Engineering; Earthquake Engineering; Software
- Founded: Berkeley, California, U.S. (1975) (headquarters)
- Key people: Ashraf Habibullah, S.E. (Founder, President, and CEO)
- Products: SAP2000; CSiBridge; ETABS; SAFE; PERFORM-3D; CSiCOL
- Website: csiamerica.com

Computers and Structures, Inc. (CSI) is a structural and earthquake engineering software company founded in 1975 and based in Walnut Creek, California, with additional office location in New York. The structural analysis and design software CSI produce include SAP2000, CSiBridge, ETABS, SAFE, PERFORM-3D, and CSiCOL.

One of Computer and Structure, Inc.'s software, ETABS, was used to create the mathematical model of the Burj Khalifa, currently the world's tallest building, designed by Chicago, Illinois–based Skidmore, Owings & Merrill LLP (SOM). In the Structural analysis section of their December 2009 Structural Engineer magazine article entitled "Design and construction of the world's tallest building: The Burj Dubai", since renamed to Burj Khalifa, William F. Baker, S.E. and James J. Pawlikowski, S.E. mention that gravity, wind, and seismic response were all characterized using ETABS. Further, ETABS' geometric nonlinear capability provided for P-delta effect consideration.
