= Henry J. Degenkolb =

American structural engineer (1913-1989)

- Born: 13 July 1913; Peoria, Illinois, U.S.
- Died: 9 December 1989 (aged 76); San Francisco, California
- Education: University of California, Berkeley
- Engineering career
- Discipline: structural engineering, earthquake engineering
- Practice name: Degenkolb Engineers
- Awards: Moisseiff Award, Ernest E. Howard Award, National Academy of Engineering

Henry John Degenkolb (13 July 1913 – 9 December 1989) was an American structural engineer in San Francisco, California, noted for his many contributions to earthquake engineering. He and John Gould formed a firm in 1956 that evolved into present-day Degenkolb Engineers, which has provided structural designs for many San Francisco Bay Area buildings. As an early pioneer in learning from earthquakes, Degenkolb visited many damaging earthquakes to share lessons with the profession. He served as president of the Earthquake Engineering Research Institute (EERI).

== Early career ==
Henry Degenkolb earned his B.S. Engineering degree from the University of California, Berkeley in 1936. His first job (1936 to 1939) was performing analysis for the engineers preparing for the 1939 Golden Gate International Exposition on Treasure Island in San Francisco Bay. One of those engineers was John J. Gould, Chief Structural Engineer for the exhibition. After the exhibition, Gould and Degenkolb worked on testing the timber trusses and building connections as the exhibits were dismantled. Afterwards Degenkolb worked part time for Henry J. Brunnier, Henry D. Dewell, Austin W. Earl, Henry S. Howard, A. V. "Gus" Saph, John J. Gould and various other consulting engineers.

In 1946 he joined the firm John J. Gould Consulting Engineer as chief engineer. By 1956 the firm had grown to 18 and they formed Gould-Degenkolb Engineers. After Gould's death in 1961, the firm became H. J. Degenkolb and Associates. Henry Degenkolb served as president until 1979, at which time Thomas Wosser was elected president. Today Degenkolb Engineers provides comprehensive design, rehabilitation, and consulting services to architects, building owners, hospitals, educational institutions, corporations and government agencies.

Degenkolb Engineers has been involved in many innovative projects and a leading firm in seismic design and retrofit. Some example projects are:

- The Parkmerced, San Francisco development (1948) consisting of 11 13-story apartments and numerous other buildings
- The Bank of California Building (San Francisco) (1964) on the corner of California and Sansome Streets. This 21-story tower was designed to preserved the adjacent 1908 bank building.
- Conversion of the Oakland Hotel, built in 1912, to senior citizen housing. The 1978 project required seismic strengthening to prevent collapse and reduce life safety risk. After it was damaged in the 1989 Loma Prieta earthquake additional strengthening was required.
- Renovation and design of a 16-story addition to the H. C. Moffitt Hospital as part of the University of California San Francisco Medical Center modernization program in the 1970s.
- Replacement of the Palo Alto Veterans Administration Hospital (1990-1997). This project used very strict design criteria developed by the VA that contained performance objectives that the hospital remain fully functional after a major earthquake.

== Learning From Earthquakes ==
Degenkolb was an early pioneer in learning from earthquakes. On his own time, using his own resources, he visited sites of damaging earthquakes and provided observations on why structures were damaged or performed well. Examples include the 1952 Kern County earthquake, 1964 Alaska earthquake, 1967 Caracas earthquake, 1969 Santa Rosa earthquake, 1971 San Fernando earthquake 1972 Managua earthquake, 1976 Guatemala earthquake, 1983 Sea of Japan earthquake, and 1985 Mexico City earthquake. Notably, after the 1967 Caracas earthquake, in which five modern buildings collapsed and many others were badly damaged, he and several other members of the Earthquake Engineering Research Institute (EERI) used a standardized EERI methodology for evaluating the hazard of damaged buildings.

== Professional Activities and Awards ==
Degenkolb was an early member of EERI, serving as a director from 1961 to 1963 and president from 1974 to 1978. He became a member of the Seismological Society of America in 1947 and served as associate editor of the Bulletin of the Seismological Society of America (1973-1085). He was also a member of the American Concrete Institute, American Society of Civil Engineers (honorary member, SF section president 1964), Structural Engineers Association of California (president 1958), and Structural Engineers Association of Northern California (honorary member, president 1957).

From 1972 to 1978 he was chair of the Design Committee of the Applied Technology Council project that developed Tentative Provisions for the Development of Seismic Regulations for Buildings, ATC Report 3-06.

He served on the President's Task Force on Earthquake Hazards Reduction, consulted for the California Seismic Safety Commission and received many awards. These included election to the National Academy of Engineering in 1977, the American Society of Civil Engineers Moisseiff (1953) and Ernest E. Howard Award (1968), and the Earthquake Engineering Research Institute Special Recognition Award in 1988. He was also awarded the Frank P. Brown Medal by the Franklin Institute in 1978.
