= Ellen Rathje =

American civil engineer

Ellen M. Rathje is an American civil engineer and geotechnical engineer. Her research focuses on the response of earth structures to earthquakes. She works in the University of Texas at Austin as Janet S. Cockrell Centennial Chair in Engineering in the Maseeh Department of Civil, Architectural and Environmental Engineering. She is also the 2024 president of the Earthquake Engineering Research Institute.

== Education and career ==
After a childhood interest in journalism, Rathje changed her focus to engineering in her senior year of high school, and became interested in earthquakes after the 1989 Loma Prieta earthquake in her freshman year as a university student. She majored in civil engineering at Cornell University, graduating in 1993. She continued her studies at the University of California, Berkeley, where she received a master's degree in civil engineering in 1994 and completed her Ph.D. in 1997.

She joined the University of Texas as an assistant professor of civil engineering in 1998. From 2004 to 2009 she was associate professor and J. Neils Thompson Centennial Teaching Fellow there. She was promoted to full professor and given the Warren S. Bellows Centennial Professorship in 2009, and in 2018 she was given the Janet S. Cockrell Centennial Chair in Engineering.

In 2018 she was co-chair of the Geotechnical Extreme Event Reconnaissance Association, and she was elected as president of the Earthquake Engineering Research Institute for the 2024 term.

== Research ==
Rathje's research focuses on the response to earthquakes of earth structures such as roads, dams, landfill disposal sites, and reclaimed land. This work includes the analysis of earthquake-triggered landslides and soil liquefaction through case histories and data obtained through remote sensing and site visits.

She has also led the DesignSafe project for storage, data analysis, and data visualization of natural hazards in infrastructure engineering, published research connecting oil extraction with increased earthquake activity, and developed machine learning models to predict earthquake hazards.

== Recognition ==
Rathje received the 2006 Earthquake Engineering Research Institute (EERI) Shah Family Innovation Prize, and the 2018 William B. Joyner Lecture Award of EERI and the Seismological Society of America. The American Society of Civil Engineers (ASCE) gave Rathje their Walter L. Huber Civil Engineering Research Prize in 2010, and their 2022 Ralph B. Peck Award, "for advancements to seismic site response analysis through case histories, development of case histories to inform regional seismic assessments, and leadership promoting the electronic publishing of case history data". She was named a Fellow of ASCE in 2016.

She was named to the National Academy of Engineering in 2025, "for contributions to seismic slope assessment and site response analysis and the development of cyberinfrastructure for natural hazards engineering".
