= John McClure =

John McClure may refer to:

- John McClure (admiral) (1837–1920), Scottish admiral in the Imperial Chinese Navy
- John McClure (judge) (died 1915), American judge and politician
- John McClure (poet) (1893–1956), American poet
- John McClure (producer) (1929–2014), American music producer
- John J. McClure (1886–1965), American politician from Pennsylvania
- Sir John William Maclure, 1st Baronet (1835–1901), British politician

== See also ==
- John McCluer
- McClure (surname)
