= Healdsburg Fault =

Coordinates: 38.69797°N 122.94981°W

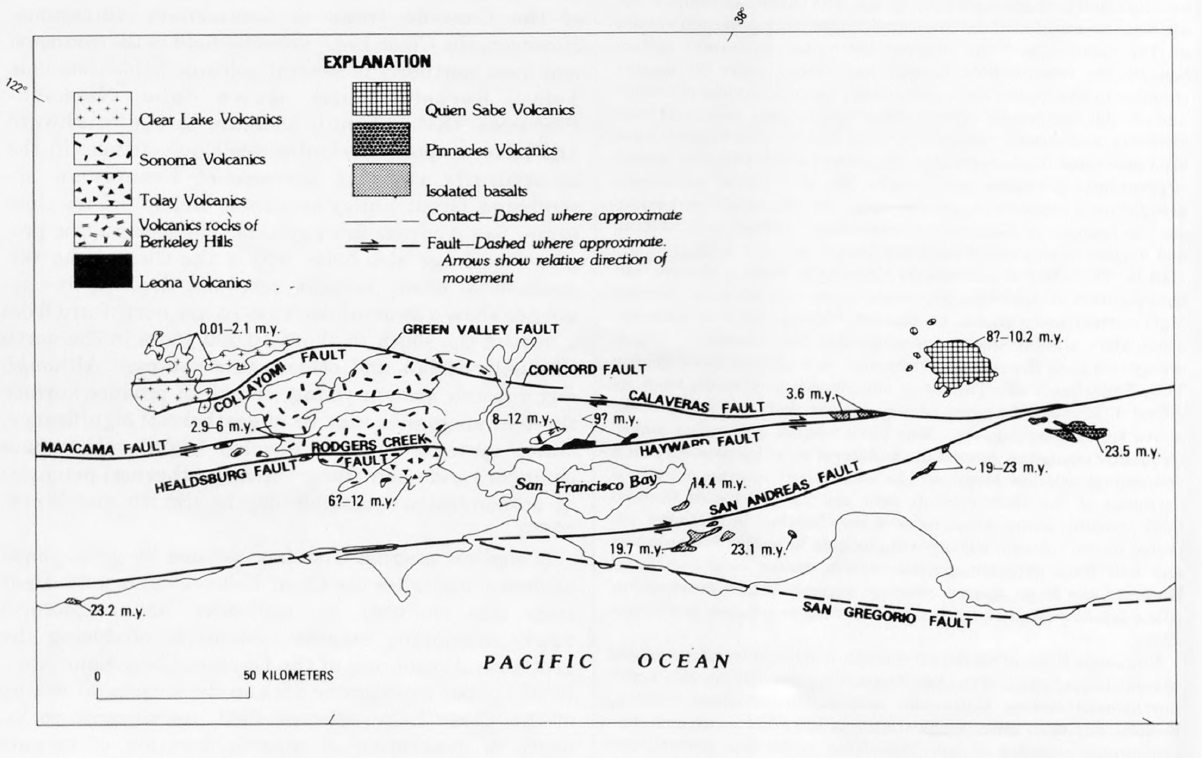
Geological map of the Healdsburg Fault

The Healdsburg Fault is a seismically active geological feature associated with the Santa Rosa Plain and the Alexander Valley, in Sonoma County, California, United States. The eastern sides of these floodplains are bounded by strike-slip or transform faults. The maximum credible earthquake expected to be generated from the Healdsburg Fault is estimated to be about 7.5 on the Richter scale.

The last major event in Sonoma County were the 1969 Santa Rosa earthquakes, a magnitude 5.6 and 5.7 doublet that occurred on this fault. The county anticipates similar events every 20–30 years.

The Rodgers Creek Fault passes through Sonoma Mountain and its north end terminates within Santa Rosa. The Healdsburg Fault continues along the east side of the Cotati Valley north of Santa Rosa, and the Healdsburg Fault is actually a step-over from the Rogers Creek fault.

The upper soil surface above the Santa Rosa Plain is composed of Plio-Pleistocene alluvial fan deposits. Further north, one encounters Quaternary alluvium from the Russian River and its tributaries. North and east of Healdsburg, the Healdsburg fault cuts through Lower Cretaceous marine rocks with stringers of Mesozoic ultrabasic intrusive volcanic rocks.

== See also ==
- Taylor Mountain
