= P-delta effect =

In structural engineering, the P-Δ or P-delta effect refers to the abrupt changes in ground shear, overturning moment, and/or the axial force distribution at the base of a sufficiently tall structure or structural component when it is subject to a critical lateral displacement. A distinction can be made between P-delta effects on a multi-tiered building, written as P-Δ, and the effects on members deflecting within a tier, written as P-δ.

P-delta is a second-order effect on a structure which is loaded laterally. One first-order effect is the initial deflection of the structure in reaction to the lateral load. The magnitude of the P-delta effect depends on the magnitude of this initial deflection. P-delta is a moment found by multiplying the force due to the weight of the structure and applied axial load, P, by the first-order deflection, Δ or δ.

NUMERICAL EXAMPLE OF P DELTA EFFECT ON A CALCULATOR You have a 1 meter tall rigid vertical rod that rotates on a hinge at the bottom of the rod. There is a 1 newton load on the top of the rod. The rod has a hinge with a rotational stiffness of 0.8 newton meters per radian of rotation. So you input any initial rotational angle on the rod. The following table shows that the rod will iterate to 1.13 radians where the rod will be in stable equilibrium. The formula for this table is next radians rotation=sin(last radians rotation)/.8 In the table from the formula you can see the rod starts at .1 radians and iterates to 1.13 radians where it is in stable equilibrium. .1 .124 .156 .194 .241 .300 .367 .448 .542 .645 .751 .853 .942 1.01 1.06 1.09 1.11 1.12 1.12 1.13 1.13 and so on as it converges to 1.13 radians where the rod is stable. The P DELTA effect finds the stable final deformed shape of a structure just like how the rod rotates to a final deformed position at 1.13 radians. The idea is that iteratively repeated linear structural analyses can solve a non linear structural analysis problem. It takes multiple iterations of a linear analysis to compute the final deformed shape of a structure where the P DELTA effect is significant.

To illustrate the effect, consider a case in statics, a perfectly rigid body anchored on the ground subject to small lateral forces. In this example, a concentrated vertical load applied to the top of the structure and the weight of the structure itself are used to compute the ground reaction force and moment. Real structures are flexible and will bend to the side. The amount of bending is found through a strength of materials analysis. During this side displacement, the top has changed position and the structure is experiencing an additional moment, P×Δ, or near the middle, P×δ. This moment is not accounted for in a basic first-order analysis. By superposition, the structure responds to this moment by additional bending and displacement at the top.

In some sense, the P-delta effect is similar to the buckling load of an elastic, small-scale solid column given the boundary conditions of a free end on top and a completely restrained end at the bottom, with the exception that there may exist an invariant vertical load at the top of the column. A rod planted firmly into the ground, given a constant cross-section, can only extend so far up before it buckles under its own weight; in this case the lateral displacement for the solid is an infinitesimal quantity governed by Euler buckling. If the lateral displacement and/or the vertical axial loads through the structure are significant then a P-delta analysis should be performed to account for the non-linearities.
