= W. Don McClure =

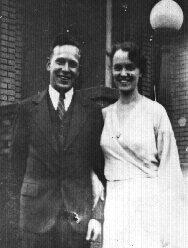
- Don and Lyda McClure, 1934.
- Born: William Donald McClure; April 28, 1906; Blairsville, Pennsylvania, US
- Died: March 27, 1977 (aged 70); Gode, Ethiopia
- Cause of death: Gunshot
- Education: Westminster College, B.A. 1928; Pittsburgh Theological Seminary, B.D. 1934; Westminster College, D.D. 1947
- Occupation: Evangelist
- Spouse(s): Lyda Lake Boyd (m. 1932–1977; his death)
- Children: Margaret (Marghi) Jean; William Donald Jr. Lyda (Polly) Lake
- Religion: United Presbyterian
- Ordained: United Presbyterian, 1934
- Writings: Red Headed, Rash and Religious,
- Congregations served: Murrysville, PA, 1932-1934
- Title: Rev. Dr.

William Donald McClure (April 28, 1906 – March 27, 1977) was an American Presbyterian missionary in Africa. Born in Blairsville, Pennsylvania, McClure graduated from Westminster College, New Wilmington, Pennsylvania. He began teaching in Khartoum, Sudan in 1928, returning to the United States three years later to study at Pittsburgh Theological Seminary. After graduation and ordination in 1934, McClure and his wife, Lyda, began work in Doleib Hill, Sudan with the Shulla people. During this time, McClure began to question the traditional missionary approach to indigenous people. McClure was convinced that a large staff employed for a limited time would result in a self-sustaining, self-governing, self-propagating church. In 1938 he initiated a new mission with the Anuak people at Akobo on the Sudan-Ethiopia border. A team of specialists in education, agriculture, medicine and evangelism were expected to work for 15 years. Although never fully staffed and interrupted by World War II, the Akobo mission became so successfully established that in 1950 the McClures were able to open new work among the Anuaks in the Ethiopian village of Pokwo. By 1960, McClure was directing a third station at Gilo River while serving in Addis Ababa as the general secretary of the American Presbyterian Mission. Ethiopian Emperor Haile Selassie, who had long supported McClure's pioneering work, requested that the American mission replicate the Anuak project among Somali nomads in the Somali border town of Gode, Ethiopia. The American Presbyterian mission declined to support this new cooperative venture between church and state, so Don and Lyda McClure began by themselves with the help of their longtime mission supporters. McClure was shot and killed by guerrillas in Gode on March 27, 1977. Don McClure was the first entrant in the book of Presbyterian martyrs. The biography of Don McClure called "Adventure in Africa" by Charles Partee has been out of print since the early 1990s, is now available in an electronic version.

== Family and early life ==
W. Don McClure was the third child born into a family of four boys and three girls. His mother, Margaret McNaugher, held a college chair of Greek and Latin before her marriage to Robert Elmer McClure. Rev. McClure served his entire fifty-five year career in the United Presbyterian Church in a single pastorate in Blairsville, PA. Don's interest in an ageless, hardy adventuresome life came from his father, who went on a big game hunt with Don at the age of 70 and hunted the woods of Pennsylvania past his 91st birthday.

== Ministry ==
=== Khartoum (1928-1931) ===
McClure's American Presbyterian denomination had been working along the lower Nile in Egypt for several decades when the mission was requested to establish an outpost in Sudan. At loose ends after college, McClure joined the Khartoum mission and found himself working in unfocused helpfulness as a teacher, agriculturalist, unlicensed physician, veterinarian, part-time evangelist, big-game hunter, and full-time handyman. He also found his life's companion, Lyda Lake Boyd. They married in 1932 and together they decided to return to Sudan as missionary husband and wife.

=== Doleib Hill (1934-1938) ===
After seminary, the McClures returned to Africa in 1934 and were assigned to live among the Shulla people in South Sudan (a.k.a. Shilluks). In this outpost, the McClures served their apprenticeship in frontier evangelism, agriculture, animal husbandry, rudimentary medicine, building construction, education, the languages and cultures of black Africa, and survival in primitive conditions involving almost daily encounters with lions, crocodiles, elephants, and hippos.

=== The Anuak Project (1938-1962) ===
The Anuak people straddle the border between Western Ethiopia and Sudan. In the 1930s, the American Mission had been discussing a mission among the Anuaks for two decades, but the normal cost to establish a mission station was $20,000 (~$150,000 in 2009 dollars). Don and Lyda were willing to inaugurate the work among the Anuak people using locally-obtainable materials (with the exception of screen wire for windows). Therefore, in 1937, the McClures established their station in Akobo for $1,000. Don was a dynamic speaker and fundraiser.

Pictures, Super 8 film, reel-to-reel audio and tape cassettes combined to give an overview of Don's ministry.

==== Akobo (1938-1950) ====
McClure estimated the Anuak population at 60,000, with 20,000 living in Sudan and 40,000 living in Ethiopia. Although the majority of Anuaks lived in Ethiopia, and their king lived in a village called Gok on the Ethiopian side, the Italian occupation of Ethiopia required the McClures to start their work in Sudan at the periphery of the tribe.

==== Pokwo (1950-1962) ====
Don McClure's Anuak Project was inaugurated at Akobo and came to an end at the Gilo River station, but its fullest and deepest expression was at Pokwo. McClure secured an audience and the personal interest and permission of His Imperial Majesty, Haile Selassie I, to continue work in Ethiopia. At Pokwo (in Anuak "village of life"), McClure was at the height of his powers in evangelism, agriculture, pioneer education, and primitive medicine as well as wisdom in combating superstition, especially witchdoctors. After some years, McClure reported that the Christian gospel had been preached in every Anuak village. In some villages, as many as fifty Christians held regular services and at least one new Christian lived in nearly every village. Ten percent of the Anuaks were now literate and a few books, including the New Testament, had been printed in their language. Poultry and cattle were improved; fruit trees were multiplying and more than half of the people had been treated in the medical clinics. The mission at Pokwo was nearly self-sustaining, so McClure prepared to start a new work on the Gilo River.

==== Gilo River (1960-1962) ====
The Gilo River station was near the center of the Anuak tribe and where McClure had once hoped to begin his service. Now he expected to spend his final years there. The plan remained the same: a large group of specialists (in evangelism, education, agriculture, and medicine) deployed for a short period of time. Among his most creative ideas, McClure challenged young American men and women to volunteer a year of service in Africa without pay. In return, he provided them room, board, and plenty of work, which on the isolated and virtually inaccessible Gilo River meant first hacking an airstrip out of the forest. Among the early volunteers were the McClures' son, Don Jr., and daughter, Lyda. By this time, the church established at Gilo could be served by a trained Anuak pastor. No cattle could be raised at Gilo because it was an area that suffered from trypanosomiasis, or African sleeping sickness.

=== Addis Ababa (1962-1970) ===
As his church's senior missionary in Ethiopia, McClure was requested to become the administrative head of the American Mission representing and facilitating all its activities in Ethiopia. Exchanging field service for desk work, McClure dealt with the various ministries of the government, cultivated relations between various political and ecclesiastical factions, and tried to continue the expansion on the Gilo River, which was only a day's walk from the Sudan border and had become extremely dangerous because of the civil war in South Sudan. Because of his work with the United Nations Committee of Refugee Relief, McClure was classified as an enemy of the Sudanese nation. When the war caused the deportation of all Christian missionaries, Sudan asked all neighboring countries to refuse them entry. However, due to McClure's persistence, a single exception was made for his old Sudanese colleagues who were able to continue their missionary work in East Africa.

=== Gode (1970-1977) ===
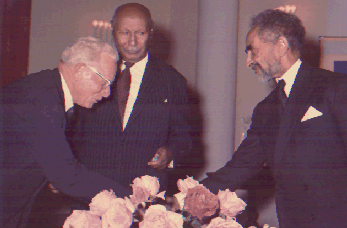
Don McClure, Tefara Worq and Haile Selassie

Concerned with border disputes in the north with Eritrea, in the west with Sudan, and the east with Somalia, the Ethiopian government planned to build a model city on the banks of the Wabe Shebelle river about 150 miles from the Somali border. With the hope that warring nomads would become peaceful agriculturalists, Haile Selassie, in person, asked McClure (and his church) to supervise the medical and educational work in this new city called Gode. For all his previous projects in Ethiopia, McClure had asked for the Emperor's permission. Now he had to respond to a direct request, involving a cross country move, working with a new people, and speaking a different language. In addition, McClure was approaching mandatory retirement age. Still, he expected that he could get the Gode project firmly underway. Moreover, he thought his church had promised Ethiopia that a Christian mission would be established at Gode. On that basis, in that he had given his word to the Emperor, and when no move was made to implement the program by the church officials in New York, McClure felt honor bound to begin by himself. He began work in 1970, as an independent missionary retired from the American mission and funded independently.

== Death ==
Letter sent home by Lyda and Don Jr. Describing the events of March 27, 1977

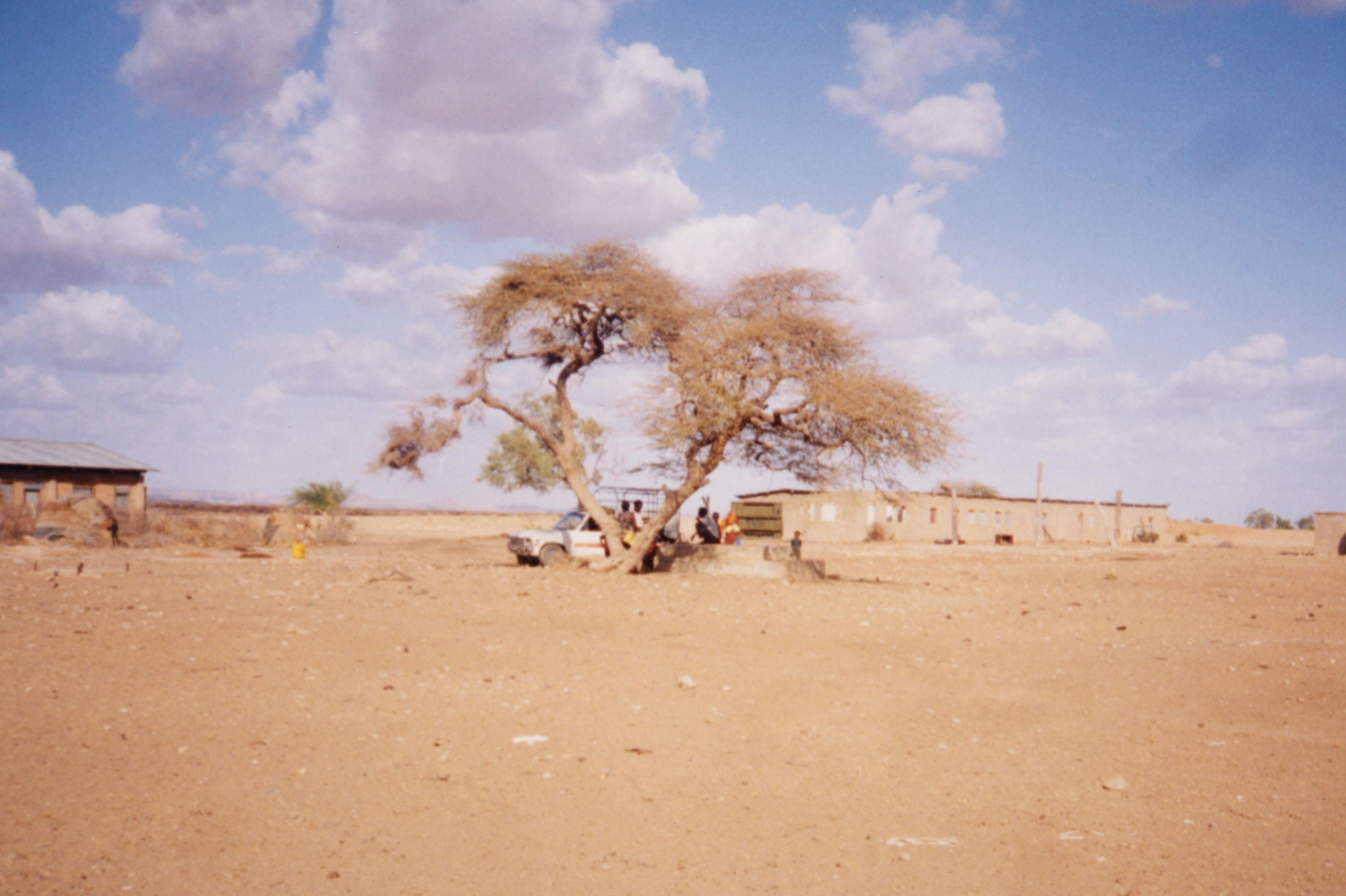
Don McClure's gravesite outside Gode, Ethiopia

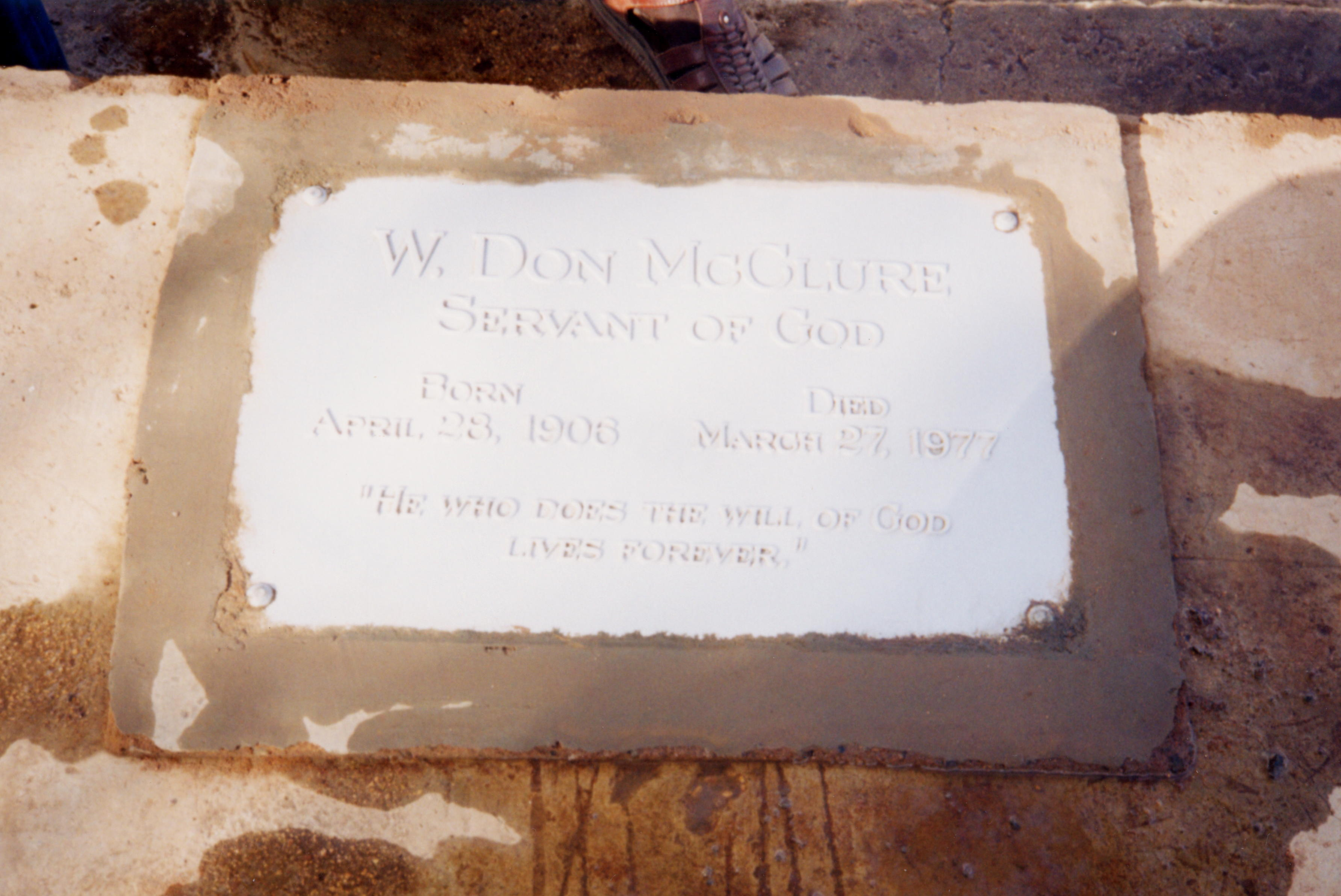
Photograph of marker placed on gravesite in 2001.

McClure was killed by guerillas on March 27, 1977, in Gode, Ethiopia. With his son, Don Jr., he had flown to the Gode station five days earlier to make final arrangements to turn the station over to World Vision. Lyda McClure was also scheduled to go with them, but was pulled from the flight because of a high priority passenger. The SIM missionaries in K'elafo had been held hostage and then evacuated, landing in Gode long enough to recount their harrowing experiences. Don requested that Lyda charter a plane to fly them out, although that flight would not occur until the weekend. About 1:30 Sunday morning, Don Jr. heard noises from his father's bedroom. When he investigated, he found the house surrounded by armed men. Graeme Smith (World Vision) heard the noises from a nearby house and came over to investigate. Smith and the two McClures were taken out into the yard. After the houses were looted, the command was given to shoot. A blast of gunfire killed Don Sr., but Smith and Don Jr. were spared. The guerillas who had rounded up the rest of the Smith family, two World Vision nurses and two German technicians were confused by the gunfire and ran away. Don Sr. was buried in Gode, Ethiopia at 10 a.m. March 28, 1977. In the summer of 2000, Don McClure's grandson, Jonathan Partee (son of Margaret Jean), returned to Gode to find the simple metal cross bearing McClure's name had been removed. In 2001, a new marker was placed on the gravesite which reads:

W. Don McClure
Servant of God
Born April 28, 1906
Died March 27, 1977
"He who does the will of God lives forever."

== Honors ==
1977 Distinguished Alumni of Pittsburgh Theological Seminary (Class of 1934).
