= Farzana Panhwar =

Pakistani scientist (1957–2020)

Farzana Panhwar (15 September 1957 – 12 February 2020) was a Pakistani scientist, researcher, and agriculturist. She wrote more than 100 scientific articles published in foreign journals, ranging from agriculture to food sciences, biochemistry, and environmental studies. Her research earned her multiple international awards, including the Swiss Prize for Women's Creativity in Rural Life (1997) and the United States' Gold Medal of Honor (1998).
