= Mohammad Aslam Uqaili =

Mohammad Aslam Uqaili is Former Vice Chancellor of Mehran University of Engineering and Technology, Jamshoro, Pakistan and a Professor in the Department of Electrical Engineering.

Uqaili graduated with a Bachelor of Engineering in Electrical and Electronics Engineering from the NED University of Engineering and Technology in 1986. He has earned masters and doctoral degrees in electrical engineering and masters in economics.
