= Robert A. Olson =

American soil scientist

- Born: April 14, 1917
- Died: July 18, 1987 (aged 70)
- Education: University of Nebraska (AB, MS)
- Scientific career
- Fields: Agronomy
- Workplaces: University of Nebraska

Robert August Olson (April 14, 1917 – July 18, 1987) was an American soil scientist. He was a professor of agronomy at the University of Nebraska, and one of the first to prove and warn that nitrogen fertilizers could harm crops and pollute groundwater.

== Education and career ==
Olson was born in Fullerton, Nebraska, and grew up in eastern Nebraska. He was educated at the University of Nebraska, where he received an AB in chemistry and soils, and after service as a naval air navigator during World War II, an MS degree in soils. His MS thesis was titled The Relation of Soil Properties and Fertilization to Winter Wheat Production in Nebraska, and was advised by R. H. Rhoades. Upon completion of the master's degree, he was hired in 1948 as a professor of agronomy at the same university, where he remained for most of his career. He retired and was granted emeritus status in 1986.

Other than teaching at the University of Nebraska–, Olson served as a consultant at the OECD in Paris in 1958 and the International Atomic Energy Agency in Vienna in 1962. Between 1967 and 1969 he served as manager of the Food for Hunger Campaign Fertilizer Program for the Food and Agriculture Organization in Rome. After the Chernobyl disaster, he helped assess and mitigate the effects of the disaster on agriculture.

He authored over 100 topical publications and book chapters and was associate editor of Soil Science Society of America Journal and soils editor of Agronomy Journal.

== Selected publications ==
- Olson, R.A., E.C. Seim and J. Muir. 1973. Influence of agricultural practices on water quality in Nebraska: A survey of streams, groundwater, and precipitation. Water Resources Bulletin 9:301-311.
- Muir, J., E.C. Seim and R.A. Olson. 1973. A study of factors influencing the nitrogen and phosphorus contents of Nebraska waters. Journal of Environmental Quality 2:466-470.
- Olson, R.A. 1977. Fertilizers for Food Production vs Energy Needs and Environmental Quality. Ecotoxicology and Environmental Safety 1:311-326.
- Olson, R.A., K.D. Frank, P.H. Grabouski and G.W. Rehm. 1982. Economic and agronomic impacts of varied philosophies of soil testing. Agronomy Journal 74:492-499.
- Muir, J., J.S. Boyce, E.C. Seim, P.N. Mosher, E.J. Deibert and R.A. Olson. 1976. Influence of crop management practices on nutrient movement below the root zone in Nebraska soils. Journal of Environmental Quality 5:255-259.
- Boyce, J.S., J. Muir, A.P. Edwards, E.C. Seim and R.A. Olson. 1976. Geologic nitrogen in Pleistocene loess of Nebraska. Journal of Environmental Quality 5:93-96.

== Death ==
Olson died on July 18, 1987, from injuries sustained in a motor vehicle accident.

== Honors and awards ==
Olson was a fellow of the American Society of Agronomy and of the Soil Science Society of America. He received the ASA International Service Agronomy Award, the Agronomic Achievement Award-Soils, the Soil Science Distinguished Career Award, the SSSA Bouyoucos Soil Science Distinguished Career Award, among others. In 2019, he received the Department of Agronomy and Horticulture Alumni Lifetime Achievement Award from the University of Nebraska–Lincoln.
