= Dawood University of Engineering & Technology =

Public university in Karachi, Sindh, Pakistan

Coordinates: 24.8788°N 67.0475°E

Dawood University of Engineering and Technology
- جامعہ داؤد برائے انجینئرنگ و ٹیکنالوجی
- Other names: DUET
- Former names: Dawood College of Engineering and Technology
- Motto: University of Relevance
- Type: Public university
- Established: 1962
- Founders: Seth Ahmed Dawood
- Academic affiliations: Higher Education Commission (Pakistan); Pakistan Engineering Council; Pakistan Council for Architects and Town Planners
- Vice-Chancellor: Engr. Prof. Dr. Samreen Hussain (S.I, T.I)
- Location: Karachi, Sindh, Pakistan
- Colours: Cyan, black, white
- Website: duet.edu.pk

The Dawood University of Engineering and Technology (initials:DUET) (Urdu: جامعہ داؤد برائے انجینئرنگ و ٹیکنالوجی) is a public university located in Karachi, Sindh, Pakistan. It was established by Seth Ahmed Dawood and is named after him.

== History and overview ==
Dawood College of Engineering and Technology was established in 1962 as a federal government engineering institution. Initial financial endowment and foundation stone of the Dawood College of Engineering and Technology was laid by then President of Pakistan Field Marshal Mohammad Ayub Khan in 1962. It was established by Dawood Foundation under the supervision of Seth Ahmed Dawood in 1964.

It is regarded as one of the oldest institutions of higher learning in engineering in Pakistan and pioneer in the fields of electronics, chemical, petroleum, metallurgical and industrial engineering degrees.

== Recognized university ==
It is one of the notable institutions in Karachi and secured its place in the engineering category by the Higher Education Commission of Pakistan, as of 2010.

In 2013, the Government of Sindh upgraded it to a university, renaming it 'Dawood University of Engineering and Technology'.

== Academics ==
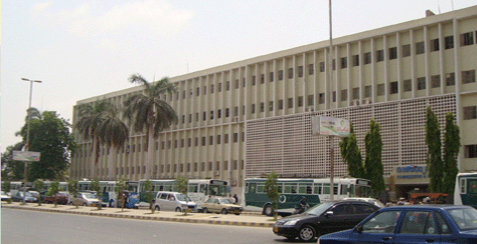
Dawood University of Engineering and Technology

=== Bachelor's programs ===
- BS Computer Science
- BS Mathematics
- BS Business and Information Systems
- BS Chemistry
- BS Environmental Sciences
- BS Artificial Intelligence
- BS Cyber Security
- BE Chemical Engineering
- BE Electronic Engineering
- BE Industrial Engineering and Management
- BE Metallurgy and Materials Engineering
- BE Petroleum and Gas Engineering
- BE Telecommunication Engineering
- BE Computer System Engineering
- BE Energy and Environment Engineering
- BArch Architecture and Planning

=== Master's programs ===
- MS Telecommunication Engineering
- MS Chemical Engineering
- MS Electronic Engineering
- MS Metallurgy and Materials Engineering
- MS Industrial Engineering and Management
- MS Industrial Chemistry
- MS Chemistry

=== Doctoral programs ===
- PhD Telecommunication Engineering
- PhD Chemical Engineering
- PhD Electronic Engineering
- PhD Computer System Engineering
- PhD Metallurgy and Material Engineering
- PhD Industrial And Management Engineering

== See also ==
- Dawood Group
- NED University of Engineering and Technology, Karachi
- Mehran University of Engineering and Technology, Jamshoro
- List of universities in Pakistan
- List of engineering universities and colleges in Pakistan
