= 1975 Oroville earthquake =

Magnitude 5.9 California earthquake

- Location within California
- UTC time: 1975-08-01 20:20:12
- ISC event: 724585
- USGS-ANSS: ComCat
- Local date: 1 August 1975
- Local time
- Magnitude: 6.1 M_{w}
- Depth: 10 km (6.21 mi)
- Epicenter: 39.432°N 121.546°W
- Areas affected: California
- Max. intensity: MMI VIII (Severe)

The 1975 Oroville earthquake occurred on August 1, 1975 in California and had a magnitude of 5.9. It is one of only two earthquakes in the Western Hemisphere which were predicted.

The epicenter of the earthquake was about 8 kilometres (5.0 mi) south-southeast of the town of Oroville, California and at a depth of about 5 kilometres (3.1 mi) below the Oroville Dam. The earthquake was predicted with a few hours warning, following an unusual sequence of smaller earthquakes which in retrospect turned out to be foreshocks.

Following the experience gained from the formation of artificial lakes behind large dams such as the Hoover Dam, Nevada and the Oued Fodda, Algeria, an ORV seismographic station was established to closely monitor induced earthquakes should they occur. This induced seismicity is the result of the load exerted by the water column on the upper part of the crust; this load breaks the balance that existed before formation of the lake, renewing the activity of ancient and inactive faults, and/or activating planes of weakness in the rocks. These are usually low-magnitude earthquakes. The water mass in Oroville reservoir was of 4.3 billion cubic meters of water.

Not only the load itself causes an induced earthquake. The crust's rocks contain a little amount of water in their pores; in these (sometimes microscopic) holes, many minerals exist. As more water enters these rocks, the pore pressure inside increases, slightly increasing the distances between the mineral components. However, if the rocks are crossed by an inactive dormant fault, the increase in pore pressure reduces the friction along the fault and may allow an earthquake to occur.

After Lake Oroville formed and reached its maximum volume in July 1969, no earthquakes occurred for nearly six years, until a magnitude 3.5 earthquake occurred on June 28, 1975. In the following month, about 20 more earthquakes were recorded and on August 1, 1975, a magnitude 4.7 earthquake occurred and shortly after that, the main earthquake of magnitude 5.9 was felt in a large part of northern California and in part of Nevada. The dam was not damaged, but minor damage was caused to buildings in the town of Oroville.

It is unclear why, for 6 years after the completion of the formation of the lake in its full volume, there was seismic silence. A possible hypothesis is that because during the winter of 1974/5 large amounts of water were released from the lake to make room for the snowmelt in the spring, the rapid filling of the snowmelt water caused a major change in the hydrostatic pressure. That may have caused some dormant fault south of the lake to reactivate.
