= Structural Engineers Association of Northern California =

The Structural Engineers Association of Northern California (SEAONC) is a structural engineering association established in 1930. Its headquarters are in San Francisco, California. Initially a club for structural engineers to exchange technical information, it evolved into a professional organization advising on the development of building code requirements and California legislation related to earthquake hazard reduction such as the Field Act and Alquist Priolo Special Studies Zone Act.

SEAONC is the northern California section of the statewide Structural Engineers Association of California (SEAOC). SEAOC's Recommended Lateral Force Requirements, a.k.a. "Blue Book", first published in 1959, has since influenced the development of seismic analysis and design provisions in building codes nationwide.

== See also ==
- National Council of Structural Engineers Associations
