= Earthquake Engineering Research Institute =

Earthquake Engineering Research Institute (EERI)
- EERI logo

Agency overview
- Formed: 1948
- Headquarters: Oakland, CA
- Parent agency: U.S. Coast and Geodetic Survey (when founded)
- Website: www.eeri.org

The Earthquake Engineering Research Institute (EERI) is a leading technical society in dissemination of earthquake risk and earthquake engineering research both in the U.S. and globally. EERI members include researchers, geologists, geotechnical engineers, educators, government officials, and building code regulators.

== History ==
The EERI was formed in 1948 as an advising committee of the United States Coast and Geodetic Survey. It quickly became its own independent, nonprofit organization, with the purpose of studying why buildings fail under earthquake disasters, and what methods can prevent these failures. At first they conducted their research in laboratories of different University or Government groups. As the EERI grew, they began to more often send research funds to the Universities, and have the university conduct the research. EERI focused more on identifying and investigating areas in need of research, and policymaking based on the university's lab results.

In 1952 the EERI organized the first conference on earthquake engineering (Symposium on Earthquake and Blast Effects on Structures), at UCLA. In 1956, in observation of the 50th anniversary of the 1906 San Francisco earthquake, they held the first World Conference on Earthquake Engineering at University of California, Berkeley. In 1984, the 8th World Conference was held in San Francisco. This conference brought in scientists from 54 countries.

At first, membership to the EERI was limited to invite-only engineers and scientists. In 1973, they began to select members by application, and increased their membership from 126 to 721 by 1978. In 1991, EERI began receiving funding from the Federal Emergency Management Agency (FEMA), to continue publishing information on how to reduce damage from earthquakes.

After a number of location changes, the EERI headquarters settled in Oakland, California.

Their quarterly journal, Earthquake Spectra, covers current research on earthquake engineering and is available online or by subscription. Its target audience is any geologist, seismologist, or related engineer. EERI also publishes many other types of information, including a monthly newsletter, the Connections oral history series, and field investigation reports.

EERI Presidents

- Ellen M. Rathje (2025 - )
- Janiele Maffei (2023 -2025)
- David Cocke (2021 - 2023)
- Laurie A. Johnson (2019 - 2020)
- David Friedman (2017 - 2018)
- Mary C. Comerio (2015 - 2016)
- Ian G. Buckle (2013 - 2014)
- L. Thomas Tobin (2011 - 2012)
- Farzad Naiem (2009 - 2010)
- Thalia Anagnos (2007 - 2008)
- Craig D. Comartin (2005 - 2006)
- Thomas D. O'Rourke (2003 - 2004)
- Chris D. Poland (2001 - 2002)
- Christopher Arnold (1999 - 2000)
- Joanne M. Nigg (1997 - 1998)
- Loring A. Wyllie (1995 - 1996)
- Lloyd S. Cluff (1993 - 1994)
- J. Carl Stepp (1991 - 1992)
- Robert D. Hanson (1989-90)
- Frank E. McClure (1987 - 1988)
- Robert V. Whitman (1985 - 1986)
- Mihran S. Agbabian (1983 - 1984)
- Paul C. Jennings (1981 - 1982)
- John A. Blume (1978 - 1980)
- Henry J. Degenkolb (1974 - 1977)
- C. Martin Duke (1970 - 1973)
- Karl V. Steinbrugge (1968 - 69)
- John E. Rinne (1966 - 67)
- Paul E. Jeffers (1952 - 53)
- George W. Housner (1950 - 51, 1954, & 1965)
- Lydik S. Jacobsen (1949)

== California earthquake assessments ==
EERI performs risk assessments on earthquake potential sites around the world. This is a quick summary of two reports on California cities.

In 2006 an engineering firm related to the EERI has projected over $122 billion in damage, if a repeat of the 1906 San Francisco earthquake occurs. This number includes damage to homes and structures, excluding fire damage. The EERI lobbies for government funding to prevent natural disasters. The money is best spent before loss of life and large-scale structural damage, though often it is not seen until afterward, as evidenced by Hurricane Katrina. The EERI and the USGS have identified that a potential large earthquake in Los Angeles would cause more damage than Katrina at New Orleans, with up to $250 billion in total damage and 18,000 deaths.

== Student involvement ==
EERI has a student chapter in 29 colleges across the U.S. to further promote interest in earthquake engineering. A few representatives from each chapter make up the Student Leadership Council (SLC). Since 2008 the EERI and SLC have held the Undergraduate Seismic Design Competition, which was previously run by the Pacific Earthquake Engineering Research Center (PEER). In this competition a team of undergraduate college students must design and construct a structure made of balsa wood. The structure is limited by many rules, such as a weight limit, the individual heights of each floor, total height limit, and more. The structure is subjected to extra weight and placed on a shake table, which moves to simulate an earthquake. An accelerometer is placed on top of the building to measure how fast the top of the building shakes. Students' structures are judged on a number of criteria, including the height of the structure, number of floors, the accelerometer readings, and whether the structure breaks. Students will want to make a building close to the height limit because the higher floors are worth more points. The annual competition is typically held along with the EERI annual meeting.
