= Applied Technology Council =

The Applied Technology Council is a nonprofit research organization based in California which studies the effects of natural hazards on the built environment and how to mitigate these effects, particularly earthquakes. It was founded through the efforts of the Structural Engineers Association of California in 1973. It does not develop building codes but does develop manuals which summarize information for engineers, and this information is sometimes used in codes, standards, and specifications.
