= 1969 Santa Rosa earthquakes =

Pair of earthquakes that struck Santa Rosa, California

- Location within California
- UTC time: Doublet earthquake: 1969-10-02 04:56; 1969-10-02 06:19
- ISC event: 803001; 803006
- USGS-ANSS: ComCat; ComCat
- Local date: October 1, 1969; 57 years ago
- Local time
- Magnitude: 5.6 and 5.7 M_{w}
- Depth: 9.6 km (6.0 mi)
- Epicenter: 38.467°N 122.692°W
- Areas affected: United States (Santa Rosa)
- Max. intensity: MMI VII (Very strong); MMI VIII (Severe)
- Aftershocks: Yes
- Casualties: 1 dead

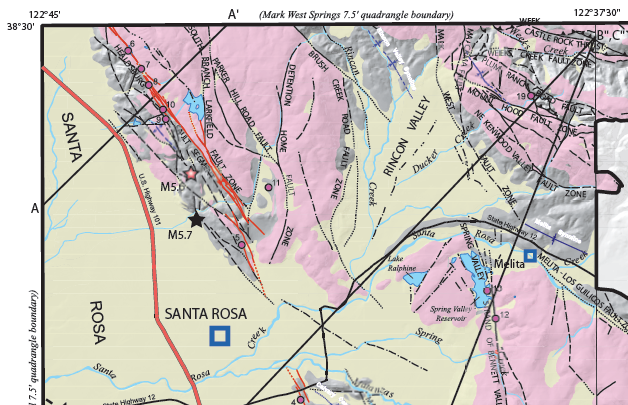
Geological structures near Santa Rosa, showing the epicenters of the 1969 earthquakes

At 04:56 and 06:19 UTC on October 2, 1969 (21:56 and 23:19 PDT October 1), a pair of earthquakes of magnitude 5.6 and 5.7, respectively, struck the city of Santa Rosa, California, killing one person and damaging buildings. The maximum felt intensity for the two events was VII (Very strong) and VIII (Severe) respectively on the Mercalli intensity scale. The $8.35 million cost of the earthquakes went mostly to replace buildings damaged beyond repair. There were at least 200 aftershocks after the initial pair of earthquakes. At the time they were the largest earthquakes to affect the northern San Francisco Bay Area since the 1906 San Francisco earthquake.

== Tectonic setting ==
The current tectonics of northern California are mainly controlled by the San Andreas Fault system, the zone of dextral strike-slip faulting that accommodates displacement between the North American plate and the Pacific plate along this transform boundary. In addition to the San Andreas Fault itself there are numerous other sub-parallel dextral strike-slip faults that take up some of the plate boundary motion distributed through a zone more than 100 km wide. The 1969 earthquakes and most of their aftershocks occurred along the Healdsburg Fault, which lies between the Maacama Fault and the Rodgers Creek Fault, linked to them by right step-overs. These faults form a continuation of the Hayward Fault Zone north of San Francisco Bay.

== Earthquake ==
The two earthquakes occurred about a kilometer apart, a few kilometers north of Santa Rosa, close to the trace of the Healdsburg Fault. The focal depths of the two mainshocks were 9.6 km and 10.4 km respectively. The first shock was described as "violent or explosive" by residents and the main shaking lasted for 15 seconds.

Earthquake epicenter	Coordinates
First earthquake	38.4733°N 122.7167°W
Second earthquake	38.4650°N 122.7183°W

== Damage ==
The earthquake caused severe damage in some areas of Santa Rosa, affecting many buildings, bringing down chimneys, causing sidewalks to buckle and rupturing underground pipes. The lack of casualties and the low number of injuries is ascribed to the earthquakes being in the evening, when there were few pedestrians in the streets. The degree of damage associated with the earthquakes was greater than expected for their magnitude, with many older building left beyond repair. Gravity data have been used to show the presence of two sedimentary basins, separated by the Trenton ridge, which is associated with the northeast-dipping Trenton thrust fault. Modeling of the ground motion for the 1906 and 1969 earthquakes shows increased shaking at the northeastern edge of the southern basin, where Santa Rosa is situated.

== Aftermath ==
Following the relatively high level of damage caused by the 1969 earthquakes, the city set about retrofitting buildings to improve their earthquake resistance by adding for instance cross-bracing to unreinforced masonry structures. The first buildings to be retrofitted were the St. Rose Church and Parish hall due to their high level of occupancy and lack of reinforcing. The safety standards adopted in Santa Rosa in 1970 provided a model for other cities in California when the state brought in requirements for retrofitting.

An analysis of the effects on structures in Santa Rosa showed that it was necessary to design buildings using dynamic principles rather than just static, even in the case of a moderate intensity earthquake.

== See also ==
- List of earthquakes in 1969
- List of earthquakes in California
- List of earthquakes in the United States
