= Geotechnical seismic isolation =

Soil based seismic demand system

Geotechnical seismic isolation (GSI) is a branch of earthquake engineering that seeks to reduce seismic demand on structures by exploiting the mechanical and dynamic properties of the soil-foundation system. In contrast to conventional structural seismic isolation, which typically relies on discrete isolation devices installed within the structural system, GSI operates within the ground and foundation domain.

GSI encompasses several families of approaches, which have been classified based on their underlying isolation mechanisms and design principles. These include facilitating the favorable effects of dynamic soil-structure interaction, isolation effects arising from sliding or rolling interfaces, embedded inclusions, and hybrid configurations. Together, these approaches reflect a shift from treating soil-structure interaction solely as a response-modifying phenomenon toward its deliberate use as a seismic protection mechanism.

== Conceptual basis ==
GSI is founded on the premise that seismic isolation effects analogous to those achieved in structural systems can be realized within the soil-foundation domain. By deliberately engineering the mechanical and dynamic properties of soils, interfaces, and ground modifications, seismic demand transmitted to structures may be reduced through mechanisms comparable to those employed in conventional structural methods.

The conceptual framework of GSI is organized into four families of approaches, distinguished according to their dominant isolation mechanisms and their analogy to established earthquake-resistant structural design strategies. These families reflect generalized physical behaviors and provide a basis for classifying a diverse range of geotechnical configurations. While each family is defined by a primary mechanism, practical systems may exhibit combined effects.

=== Isolation by compliant or low-stiffness soil layers ===
The first family of GSI approaches is based on the introduction or utilization of soil layers with relatively low stiffness compared to the surrounding ground. This mechanism is conceptually analogous to the use of elastomeric bearings in structural systems, where lateral flexibility lengthens the fundamental natural period and reduces structural demand.

In geotechnical applications, compliant layers act as deformable media that accommodate relative motion between the structure and the underlying ground. Seismic isolation arises from reduced lateral stiffness, impedance contrast, and material nonlinearity, which together can reduce structural demands.

=== Isolation by sliding or rolling interfaces ===
The second family of approaches exploits controlled sliding or rolling behavior at soil-foundation or soil-soil interfaces. This mechanism is analogous to sliding or roller-based structural seismic isolation systems, in which force transmission is limited by the low frictional resistance.

In GSI configurations, isolation effects arise when shear stresses at an interface reach a limiting value, allowing relative displacement and energy dissipation. The effectiveness of this mechanism depends on interface properties, normal stress conditions, and the dynamic interaction between vertical loading, material properties, and seismic excitation.

=== Isolation by wave modification and energy dissipation ===
The third family of approaches focuses on modifying seismic wave propagation and dissipating energy in the ground through engineered inclusions or ground modifications. This mechanism is conceptually analogous to energy-dissipating strategies in structural and mechanical systems.

In GSI applications, embedded barriers, inclusions, or specially structured zones may scatter, reflect, filter, or attenuate seismic waves before they reach the foundation. Isolation effects are governed by impedance contrast, geometric configuration, and the interaction between seismic wavelength and the characteristic dimensions of the modified ground.

=== Isolation by controlled exceedance of foundation bearing capacity ===
The fourth family of GSI approaches is characterized by the intentional under-design of foundation bearing capacity such that combined vertical, moment, and shear demands may exceed available resistance during strong earthquake excitation. In doing so, force transmission to the superstructure is capped through the activation of predefined nonlinear response mechanisms within the soil-foundation system.

The underlying principle is conceptually analogous to capacity design in structural engineering, where global collapse is prevented by allowing selected components to yield in a controlled and ductile manner. In GSI applications, the soil-foundation system is deliberately designed to develop nonlinear response through mechanisms such as rocking, uplift, or sliding, while maintaining overall stability. Isolation effects arise from the limitation of force transfer once bearing resistance is mobilized.

=== Hybrid configurations ===
In addition to the four primary families, hybrid GSI systems combine multiple isolation mechanisms within a single configuration. For example, compliant soil layers may be used in conjunction with sliding interfaces, or rocking behavior may occur alongside wave-modification effects. Hybrid configurations are not considered a distinct family but rather reflect the interaction of mechanisms defined above.

== Relationship to conventional earthquake-resistant design principles ==
GSI is closely related to established concepts in earthquake engineering, particularly conventional seismic isolation, energy dissipation, and capacity design, while differing in the domain in which isolation mechanisms are realized. Rather than introducing entirely new physical principles, GSI extends and adapts well-known seismic protection strategies to the soil-foundation system.

=== Relationship to conventional seismic isolation ===
Conventional seismic isolation aims to reduce seismic demand on structures by decoupling the superstructure from ground motion, typically through the use of discrete isolation devices such as elastomeric bearings, sliding bearings, or friction pendulum systems. These devices function by increasing lateral flexibility and limiting force transfer to the structural system.

GSI pursues similar objectives but achieves isolation effects within the ground or at the soil-foundation interface. Instead of relying on prefabricated structural components, GSI exploits the mechanical and dynamic properties of soils, interfaces, and engineered ground modifications to alter dynamic soil-structure interaction, seismic wave transmission, and force transfer. In this sense, GSI may be viewed as a geotechnical analogue of conventional seismic isolation, operating upstream of the superstructure.

While both approaches share common goals and underlying physical mechanisms, GSI differs in its reliance on soil behavior, ground modifications, and spatially distributed isolation effects. As a result, GSI is often considered as a complementary or alternative strategy, particularly in situations where conventional isolation devices may be impractical or difficult to implement.

=== Relationship to capacity design principles ===
One family of GSI approaches is conceptually linked to capacity design principles, which form a cornerstone of modern seismic design philosophy. Capacity design seeks to prevent catastrophic failure by ensuring that inelastic behavior is concentrated in predefined, ductile mechanisms while the remainder of the system remains elastic and stable.

In the context of GSI, capacity design principles are reflected in approaches that intentionally allow nonlinear response within the soil-foundation system to limit force transmission to the superstructure. By under-designing foundation capacity relative to seismic demand, controlled mechanisms such as rocking, uplift, or sliding may be activated, thereby capping transmitted forces in a manner analogous to ductile yielding in structural components.

== Construction materials ==
Materials play a central role in GSI, as isolation effects are realized through the mechanical response of soils, interfaces, and engineered ground components. Materials for GSI are therefore commonly categorized according to their functional role in modifying soil stiffness, interface behavior, or seismic wave propagation.

=== Stiffness modification ===
A primary category of materials in GSI is associated with modifying the stiffness and deformability of the soil-foundation system. By introducing materials or soil layers with reduced stiffness relative to the surrounding ground, seismic demand transmitted to the structure may be reduced through increased compliance and lengthening of system's natural period.

Engineered soils, such as rubber-soil mixtures (RSM), tire-derived aggregates (TDA), high-damping polyurethane, and EPS beads-sand mixtures, have been investigated for this purpose. The performance of such materials depends on their elastic and nonlinear stiffness properties, damping characteristics, and thickness relative to the foundation dimensions and dominant seismic wavelengths.

=== Interface modification ===
Another important category of materials is associated with modifying soil-foundation or soil-soil interfaces. In these approaches, isolation effects arise from controlled sliding at interfaces whose frictional and contact properties are deliberately tailored.

Materials investigated for interface modification include smooth or treated surfaces, low-friction interlayers, and planar geosynthetic materials, e.g., geomembranes and geogrids, designed to provide predictable interface behavior. Key considerations include interface friction, normal stress dependence, and durability under repeated loading.

=== Seismic wave modification ===
A further category of GSI materials is associated with altering seismic wave propagation within the ground. In these approaches, isolation effects result from impedance contrasts and geometric discontinuities introduced by engineered inclusions or modified ground zones.

Materials used for wave modification include super absorbent polymer (SAP) and EPS geofoam for soil replacement, trenches, columns, polyurethane injection, periodic foundation, and metamaterials. The effectiveness of these materials depends on contrasts in stiffness and density relative to the surrounding soil, as well as on the spatial configuration and scale of the modified ground with respect to seismic wavelengths.

== See also ==
- Earthquake engineering
- Earthquake-resistant structures
- Seismic base isolation
- Geotechnical engineering
- Soil-structure interaction
- Seismic retrofit
- Vibration isolation
