= Nabih Youssef =

American engineer

- Born: May 29, 1944; Egypt
- Died: July 12, 2024 (aged 80); Los Angeles, California
- Education: Cairo University; California State University, Los Angeles; University of California, Los Angeles
- Engineering career
- Discipline: Structural engineer
- Institutions: American Society of Civil Engineers; Structural Engineers Association of California
- Practice name: Nabih Youssef & Associates
- Projects: Cathedral of Our Lady of the Angels; Getty Villa; Cleveland Museum of Art Expansion; LA Live! Hotel & Residences
- Awards: 2021 AIALA Honorary 2016 Structural Engineers Association Honorary Member Award 2014 AIA/LA Design Award – The Broad (museum), Los Angeles. 2013 SEAOC and SEAOSC Excellence in Engineering awards for Dodgers Stadium. 2010 AISC President's Award for Excellence in Engineering – LA Live Hotel and Residences, Los Angeles.

Nabih Youssef, S.E., F.A.S.C.E (May 29, 1944 – July 12, 2024) was an Egyptian-American structural engineer, most recognized for his work in seismic engineering. Youssef is recognized for translating academic structural engineering concepts into practical applications, most notably through the base isolation technique employed in the Los Angeles City Hall renovations. His significant achievements also include advancements in Performance-based building design and the use of a Steel plate shear wall in areas of high seismic risk.

== Education and working life ==
In 1967, Youssef received a B.S. in Structural Engineering from Cairo University. After emigrating to the United States he received a M.S. from C.S.U.-L.A. and then a postgraduate Diploma in Earthquake Engineering from U.C.L.A.

Youssef led the engineering division at A.C. Martin Partners before founding his own firm, Nabih Youssef & Associates (NYA), in 1989.

== Notable projects ==
=== L.A. Live ===
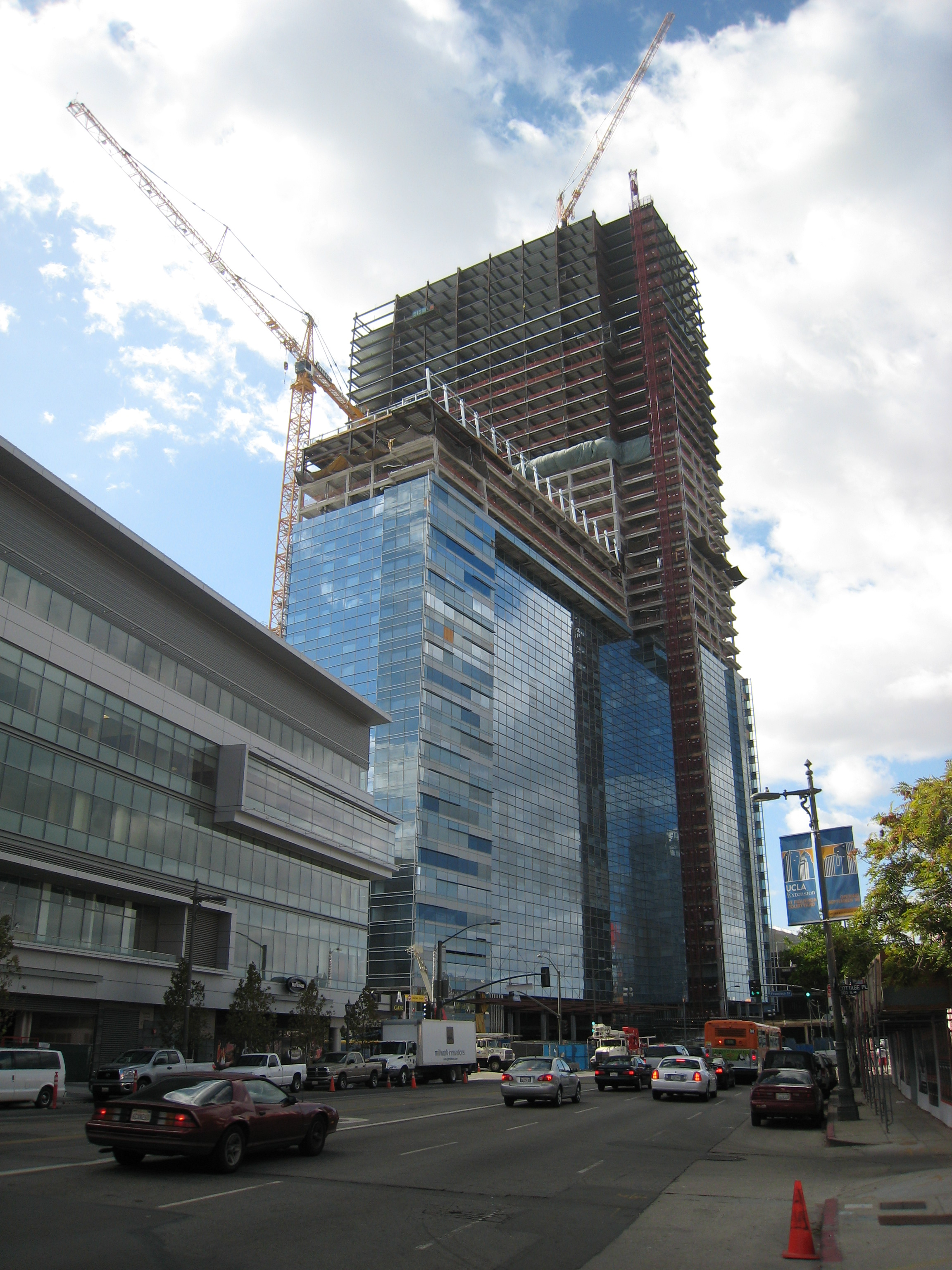
L.A. Live! Tower seen from street level.

The first of the 55-story L.A. LIVE's three development phases was completed late 2007 when the doors opened at Microsoft Theater, a 7,100 seat concert and awards show venue. Xbox Plaza (formerly Microsoft Square), a 40,000 sq. ft. open air space, featuring six 75-foot-towers with LED and static signage along with 1,500 parking spaces also debuted in phase one. It uses an advanced steel plate shear wall system to resist lateral loads and is the first building in California to do so.

The second phase began in late 2008 with The Novo (a 2,300 person venue), the Conga Room, Lucky Strike Lanes & Lounge, The GRAMMY Museum® and 2,000 more parking spaces. Restaurants opened throughout phase two, with all 13 eateries completed in 2009. Another notable phase two event was the first live broadcast from the ESPN West Coast Broadcast Center.

The last and final phase was completed in late 2009 with the grand opening of the 14-screen Regal Cinemas and in early 2010 with The Ritz-Carlton Hotel, Los Angeles, the JW Marriott Los Angeles L.A. LIVE and The Ritz-Carlton Residences at L.A.

=== Cathedral of Our Lady of the Angels ===
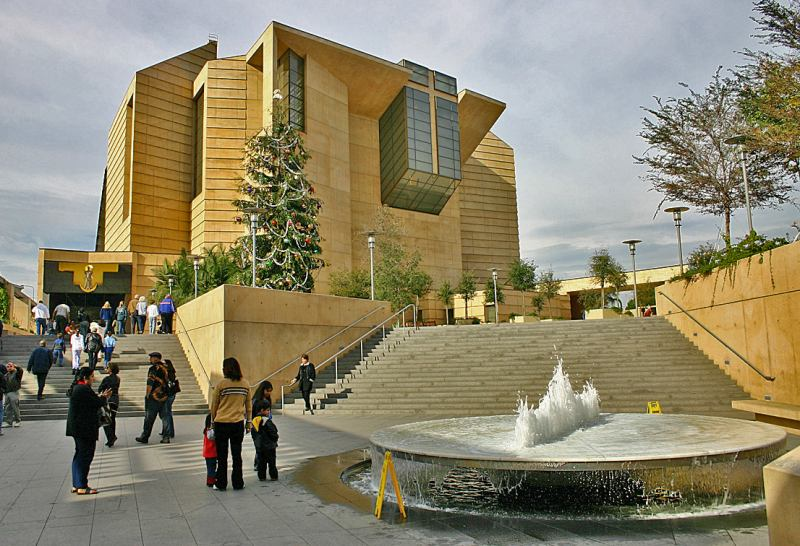
Cathedral of Our Lady of the Angels

Cathedral of Our Lady of the Angels used base isolation to achieve a structure that would last 500 years.

=== Others ===
Los Angeles

- Dodger Stadium Renovations
- J. Paul Getty Museum Villa
- Los Angeles City Hall Renovations
- Los Angeles Coliseum Renovations
- Los Angeles County Museum of Art
- Skirball Jewish Cultural Center
- The Broad Museum
- Herald Examiner Renovations

Cupertino

- Apple Campus 2 Peer Review

Stanford

- Stanford University Medical Center

Cleveland, Ohio

- Cleveland Museum of Art Expansion

=== Selected Higher Education Projects ===
USC The Village Student Housing and Retail Complex, Los Angeles, CA

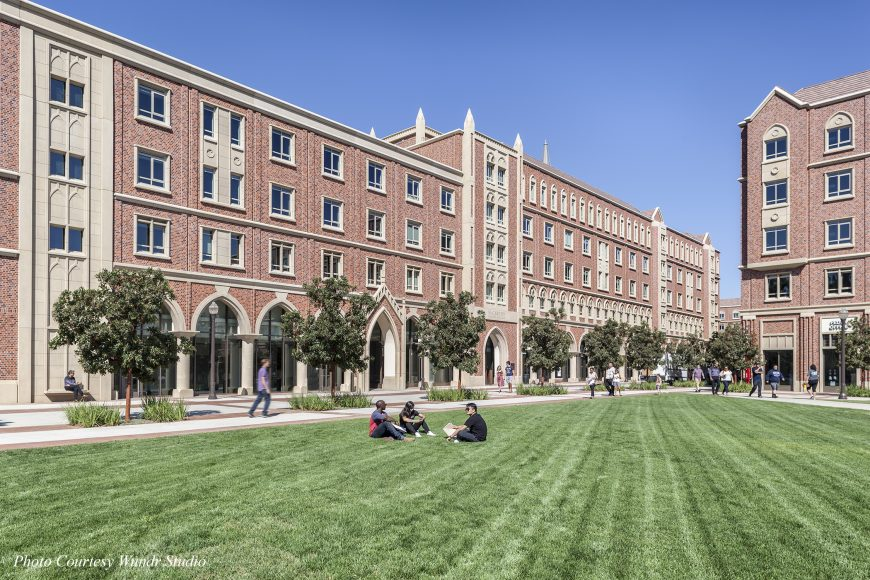
USC Village

USC Bovard Auditorium Renovation

USC Keith Administration Building

USC Newman Recital Hall

USC Olin Hall

USC Raulston

USC Leventhal School of Accounting Renovation

USC Barrick Hall Renovation

Sci-Arc Campus Restoration and Renovation

UC Berkeley Hearst Memorial Mining Building Base Isolation Peer Review

UCLA Public Policy and Social Research Building

UCLA California NanoSystems Institute

UCLA Science & Technology Research Building

UCLA Anderson School of Management Addition and Parking Structure Retrofit and Strengthening

UCLA Jules Stein Eye Institute

UCI Medical Center

== Contributions to the Field ==
Youssef pioneered the use of base isolation to seismically protect structures. He was a Lecturer at the USC School of Architecture and Sci-Arc. Additionally, Youssef was involved in various industry and governmental panels, notably:

- Congressional Office of Technology Assessment advisory panel member
- Founder and Past Chair of the Vision 2000 Committee, developing performance-based methodology
- Past Chair of the Seismology Committee of the Structural Engineers Association of California
- Past Chair of the Seismic Safety Committee of State Building Standards Commission
- Chair of Project Restore, a non-profit organization dedicated to the historic restoration and revitalization of historic facilities in Los Angeles.

== Honors & Awards ==
Sources:

- Outstanding Achievement Award from Egyptian American Organization - 1999
- Two Design-Build Institute of America Public Sector Building merit awards - 2005
- AIA Los Angeles Chapter - Presidential Award for Professional Achievement & Honoree - 2008
- ASCE Life Membership & AISC Designer Special Achievement Award - 2010
- SEAOSC Fellow - 2013
- Structural Engineers Association Honorary Member Award - 2016
- Honorary AIALA - 2021

== See also ==
- List of structural engineers
- List of Copts
- Earthquake engineering structures
