= Resgate Farm =

Coffee plantation in São Paulo, Brazil

Coordinates: 22.6331°S 44.2629°W

Resgate Farm (Portuguese: Fazenda Resgate) is a former 19th-century coffee plantation located in the municipality of Bananal, in the state of São Paulo. It is part of the so-called Paraíba Valley of São Paulo and is listed as a Historic Heritage site by Council for the Defense of Historical, Archaeological, Artistic and Tourist Heritage (CONDEPHAAT).

== Coffee economy ==
The coffee cycle was a period in Brazil's economic history, beginning in the mid-19th century and ending in 1930, during which coffee was the main product of the Brazilian economy. Coffee production developed rapidly throughout the 19th century, so that by the 1850s it already accounted for nearly half of Brazilian exports. The center-south region was chosen for cultivation because it offered the most suitable climatic conditions and soil, according to the needs of the coffee plant. The first major cultivated region was the Vale do Rio Paraíba (between São Paulo and Rio de Janeiro).

Having begun to be cultivated in 1825, the valley gathered, by the mid-19th century, the “largest share of Brazilian wealth.” The plantations followed the pattern of large American plantations—vast monoculture estates that relied on enslaved labor. Moving up the Paraíba River, coffee plantations reached São Paulo and the border region of Minas Gerais.

In 1887 Bananal was the second-largest slaveholding municipality, with 4,182 enslaved inhabitants, surpassed only by Campinas, which had 9,986. It also ranked second in terms of the value of enslaved people living there: 2,604 contos de réis (in Campinas, 6,851 contos de réis). Bananal could thus be considered one of the municipalities "of the greatest importance in coffee production."

During the period of accelerated growth of coffee cultivation in the Paraíba Valley region, more specifically between 1836 and 1837, the then village of Bananal produced 64,822 arrobas of coffee (nearly 1 ton), representing 11% of the total production of the province of São Paulo. In Bananal, 82 farms were established, with 8 sugar mills and 12 aguardente distilleries. Each of them had its location carefully analyzed:

the choice of site; the layout of the settlement; the conditioning by the presence of water for the use of hydraulic energy; and the suitability of the buildings intended for processing, storage, housing, and subsidiary activities [...].

== History ==
In 1776 the place known as "Resgate," in the province of São Paulo, near the border with what was then the province of Rio de Janeiro, gave rise to what years later would become Fazenda Resgate, in the present-day municipality of Bananal, in the Paraíba Valley of São Paulo. This site belonged to Fazenda Três Barras, the head of the sesmaria granted to Father Antônio Fernandes da Cruz. It became a farm in 1828 as a wedding dowry for Alda Rumana de Oliveira upon her marriage to Colonel Inácio Gabriel Monteiro de Barros. At that time, the property produced lard, corn, beans, flour, small quantities of coffee, and had only 77 enslaved people.

In 1833 Fazenda Resgate (where 80 enslaved people worked) was purchased by José de Aguiar Toledo, an Azorean (therefore Portuguese) merchant who arrived in Brazil around 1750. Toledo came to Bananal in the early 19th century, bringing from Minas Gerais the architectural solution implemented on the farm and pioneering large-scale coffee planting in the region. The farm was sold

for the price and sum of eighty contos de réis, for which account twenty contos de réis were received immediately, and another twenty contos de réis, for which a receipt was issued on the twenty-fifth of April of eighteen hundred and thirty-four, [...] and likewise upon the execution of this deed another twenty contos de réis were received, namely the sum of twelve contos three hundred and fifty-two thousand and eight hundred réis in current currency, and another seven contos four hundred and forty-seven thousand and two hundred réis in an order drawn upon Antônio Tertuliano dos Santos, in Rio de Janeiro.

Tertuliano was Toledo's commissioner and transferred the amount by means of a payment order. It is known that half of the negotiated value corresponded to the enslaved people who were already working at the site.

In 1838, upon Toledo's death, the productive complex headed by Fazenda Resgate (with 137,500 coffee trees and 134 enslaved people) was left to his eight children (Maria, Eufrazia, Ignacia, Maria, Antonio, Manoel, Aguida, Monica). Shortly thereafter, Manuel de Aguiar Valim bought out his siblings and established residence on the property.

In 1844 the Comendador Manuel de Aguiar Valim married Domiciana Maria de Almeida, daughter of the also comendador Luciano José de Almeida, owner of Fazenda Boa Vista. Luciano possessed one of the largest fortunes in the country.

After the approval of the Eusébio de Queirós Law (Law No. 581 of September 4, 1850), which sought to end the arrival of Africans in Brazil to be enslaved, a report circulated through the lands of the municipality of Bananal of an illegal disembarkation and the involvement of local farmers. The Minister of Justice, José Ildefonso de Souza Ramos, sent agents to investigate the event and,

on January 16, 1853, 10 newly arrived Africans and one ladino slave were seized in Bananal, on lands of Fazenda Resgate, then belonging to the police delegate Manoel de Aguiar Vallim – who would be dismissed from his position by the interim chief of police, Joaquim Fernandes da Fonseca, at the beginning of February.

In a few years, Manuel de Aguiar Valim substantially increased his fortune and, in 1855, decided to renovate the manor house of Resgate. Thus Mr. Bruce began the works on the two-story house, adapting it to the neoclassical style then fashionable in Paris. Beginning in 1858, the walls of the main house and the chapel were decorated by the painter José María Villaronga, a famous Spanish painter of the period. The reception room, is white, with friezes and gilded ornaments. The ceiling is particularly intricate, and the door panels are painted with Brazilian wildlife. The dining room and the chapel, which is a work of great value, deserve no less praise.

A sala de visitas, toda de branco, com frisos e ornatos dourados, tem o teto de muito bom gosto, e nos painéis das portas delicadas pinturas representando os pássaros mais bonitos e conhecidos do Brasil pousados nos ramos das árvores ou arbustos de sua predileção, de cujos troncos se vêem pender deliciosos e matizados frutos. A sala de jantar e a capela, que é um trabalho de muito preço, não merecem menos elogio.

The farm continued to grow:

According to the inventory of this slaveholder, the latter farm possessed 285,200 coffee trees in an area of approximately 197alqueires of virgin forests, secondary growth vegetation, and coffee plantations.[11]

By the mid-1850s, at the height of coffee production in the Province of São Paulo, Fazenda Resgate already had more than 400 enslaved people. Of these, 49 were assigned to the direct service of the master, namely: five house servants, 13 cooks, five pages, seven seamstresses, one tailor, two wet nurses, eight lady’s maids, one butler, one shoemaker, one barber, two washerwomen, one lace maker, one saddler and one gardener. At this time, the first floor of the manor house housed the slave quarters of the lady’s maids and, in front of the house, there stood a large complex with 36 ranges of slave quarters arranged in a square for the other enslaved people.

Vallim kept the list of enslaved people recorded in a book. Fazenda Resgate headed a productive complex contiguous to it where, in the 1870s, about 600 enslaved people worked. In 1878, a total of 238 were specifically allocated to Fazenda Resgate.

In 1878, when he died, Comendador Manuel de Aguiar Valim was one of the greatest fortunes of the Brazilian Empire and the largest coffee producer in the Province of São Paulo. His inventory included the farms Resgate, Três Barras, Independência and Bocaina, in addition to several other rural properties. Summing all his properties, he owned nearly 400 enslaved people, as well as a palace of "sixteen windows," houses and the Teatro Santa Cecília with its accessories in the town of Bananal. Valim possessed a fortune equivalent to 1% of all paper money circulating in Brazil, composed of numerous public debt securities (including those of the United States), as well as assets in gold, silver and diamonds. Fazenda Resgate itself had 194 alqueires with 304,000 coffee trees.

But the most important legacy left by Comendador Manoel de Aguiar Vallim was the manor house of Fazenda Resgate, listed as National Historic Heritage by National Institute of Historic and Artistic Heritage (IPHAN) in 1969 and restored beginning in 1970 at the expense of its owners.

== Architecture ==
Access to Fazenda Resgate is made by a winding path lined with a row of palm trees. The stone wall surrounding the manor house is of the canjiçado type.

The spatial configuration arranged in quadrangles, with the manor house in a position of prominence, allowed an easy supervision of activities across the complex of buildings [...] which was further expanded when activities took place in enclosed courtyards in front of the manor house. Thus, both the control of enslaved labor – subjected to the possibility of corporal punishment and to legislation extremely favorable to the plantation owner – and the control of the work carried out there were at stake.

The drying yard (terreiro) was a flat surface painted white in order to absorb and concentrate the heat of the sun, thereby accelerating as much as possible the drying of the coffee beans. The buildings and all their openings were oriented toward this enormous central void within the architectural complex. In this inhospitable space, a few enslaved people turned the coffee beans that “spread over a cement of dazzling whiteness whose brightness, under a scorching sky, is unbearable and soon forces one to rest the eyes on some patch of greenery.” For this reason, the manor house stood somewhat removed from the drying yard and was separated from it by a garden.

The manor house was built in the early nineteenth century, around 1820, with twenty rooms and based on the Portuguese manor style (with only one floor). Later it was adapted to the Minas Gerais solution for coffee production from the first half of the 19th century (already with two floors, but without great refinement), eventually receiving a neoclassical façade with a central stone staircase. The manor residence is set on land with some slope, supported by retaining walls and stone masonry and wattle-and-daub walls. Above them are walls with a timber-frame structure (posts, sill beams and wall plates), filled with adobe infill.

Its builder, Mr Bruce,

“[...] betrays his origin by adopting as his model the form of the sobradão. The sobradão is inspired by Portuguese manor houses of the eighteenth century. Its characteristic feature is a high basement under a building of only one story – the noble floor — with a staircase in the center of its façade, where a portico with a roof stands out, functioning as a veranda. In fact, Resgate was renovated and expanded in 1855, adapting the neoclassical model to the house that had already existed since the beginning of the 19th century. This can be seen in the materials used: pau-a-pique, typical of the beginning of the century, and adobe brick, typical of the mid-century."

However, despite the neoclassical façade, the rear of the house rests at ground level, in a "U"-shaped plan with three mansard roofs: two lateral and one facing the internal courtyard, characteristic of the Minas Gerais architectural arrangement. The renovation also encompassed the internal courtyard, which received a new configuration.

The dining room was placed next to it for ventilation and lighting purposes, as was customary in bourgeois residences in France, creating a new spatial arrangement. The paintings in the dining room used the trompe-l'œil technique, which "plays" with perspective and produces optical effects. This represented a fundamental change in the parameters of domestic space in 19th-century Brazil. In this way, Fazenda Resgate became a monument/document completely preserved from Brazilian history

Internally, the manor house had reception and social areas much larger than those seen in residences of previous centuries, following the format that became known as the casa paulista and the casa brasileira. In these rooms took place musical gatherings, recitative tertulias and other social activities.

These buildings were divided into three zones according to the level of access for outsiders: social (broader access), private/intimate (limited access), service. The rooms were organized in the following sequence: reception space, social salons, alcoves and bedrooms, veranda and dining room, and the service annex.

An inventory carried out in 1878 indicates the distribution of the house as follows: “entrance hall, reception room, 1st bedroom, 2nd bedroom and 3rd bedroom; office, dining room; 1st bedroom in the dining room, 2nd bedroom in the dining room, 3rd bedroom, 4th bedroom; sewing room, 5th bedroom, 6th bedroom and kitchen." Regarding the furniture of the manor house, the rooms were organized as follows:

- Reception room: piano, sofa, four armchairs, eighteen simple chairs, one table and two consoles; also lacquer furniture (mobília de charão), another sofa, two armchairs, six simple chairs, a center table and two marble-topped consoles. The simple chairs probably accommodated the audience during the days of soirées.
- Entrance hall: sofa, four armchairs, twelve simple chairs.
- Social bedrooms (for guests and visitors): beds.
- Private bedrooms (for members of the household): beds, standard chest of drawers, washstand with mirror, large dressing table with mirror, vinhático wood sofa. Some of these rooms are described as “sewing room”.
- Dining room: dining table with eighteen chairs and a marble console.

Here is the floor plan of the main level of the building:

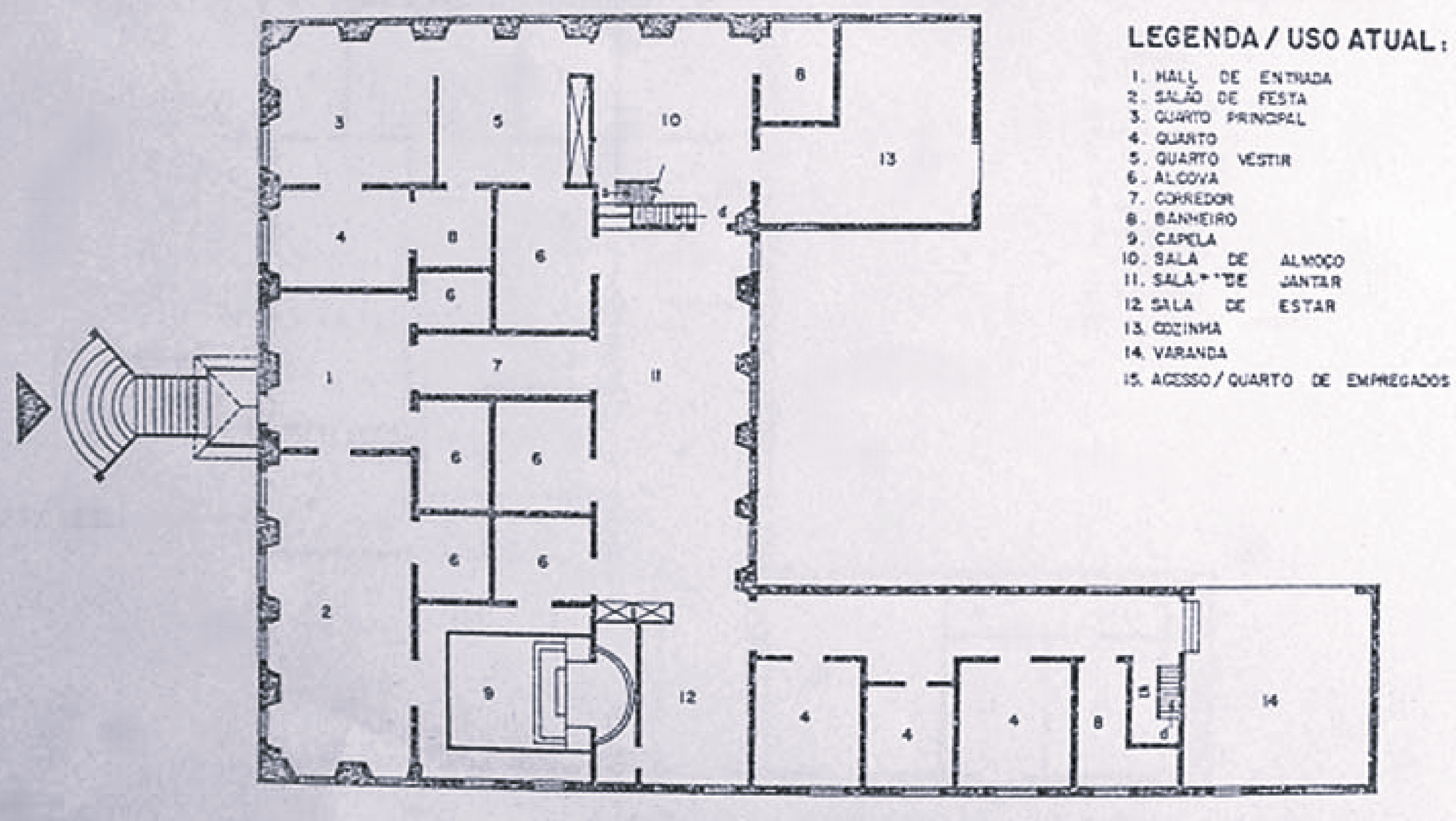
Ground floor plan of Fazenda Resgate

In 1838, the farm's coffee storehouse (tulha) was installed in a two-story building with four ranges. In 1878, the blacksmith shop, troop house and other service buildings had nine ranges.

=== Decoration ===
Beginning in 1858, the Spanish painter José Maria Villaronga started painting the second floor of the manor house of Fazenda Resgate. In the entrance atrium are depicted the agricultural products of the farm: in the central position appears coffee and, surrounding it, sugarcane, corn, beans and cassava. The mural painting by José Maria Villaronga is a trompe-l'œil with allegorical themes and native motifs of fauna and flora.

In the reception room, designed in the Baroque style, Brazilian birds are represented along with wooden details covered with gold leaf. In the dining room there are three frescoes: in the central position, the wealth of the owner; flanking this painting are two additional frescoes representing the Chinese colony of Bananal. Inside the house there are also examples of Chinese ceramic tiles.

The chapel also stands out because of its double-height ceiling and its paintings and wooden details covered with gold leaf, such as the arch above the altar and a clavichord that belonged to the Marquesa de Santos. On the mezzanine there are frescoes depicting several representations of the Virgin Mary. On the first floor, in addition to the Baroque-style altar and several paintings, a large fresco representing the Baptism of Jesus forms the central element of the space.

Partially overlapping the nave, the reception room opens toward the chapel in the form of choir and galleries, completed by a triumphal arch. On the one hand this ingenious arrangement responded to the imperatives of social segregation, while on the other it conferred a truly monumental character upon the chapel.

=== Restoration ===
The first renovation of Fazenda Resgate was carried out in 1850. Currently with 14 bedrooms, 12 bathrooms and 9 living rooms, Fazenda Resgate was acquired by the antiquarian Carlos Eduardo Kramer Machado in 1970, who began a restoration process. During this work the wooden structures, the floors and the large painted panels in the main halls created by José Maria Villaronga were recovered. In the 1980s, already under a new owner, the restoration continued through permanent maintenance. This included the conservation of the roof, entirely made with the original tiles from the period, the electrical and hydraulic systems, as well as the hardwood pieces used in doors, cabinets and decorative panels.

The walls and frescoes of the Reception Room and the Chapel were also restored, including the reconstruction of the gold decorative elements.

Fazenda Resgate represents one of the best examples of heritage conservation in Brazil. On this property, which remains privately owned and used, the owner maintains a constant professional restoration effort inside the residence. Although the house continues to be used by the owner's family, part of the residence is open to visitors.

== Enslaved people ==
Among the many activities carried out by enslaved people on a coffee plantation were those performed in blacksmith workshops, in the so-called "carpentry houses" (casas de carapinas), in sawmills, and in brickworks. "The range of trades developed on a coffee plantation can be better estimated not from the buildings themselves, but from samples of the enslaved population, which in some cases identify them by their occupation."

Among the enslaved people mentioned in the 1838 Inventory were:

Valued at 400$000:

- Antonio Poba
- Luiz Mina
- Joze Zuza
- João Barbeiro
- Ticula
- Joze Congo
- Tomás Tropeiro
- Matias Capita
- Joze Viola
- Marcos Bahiano
- Francisco Goma
- Joaquim Peão
- João Mongo
- Carlos Maiala
- Joaquim Bomba
- Tomas Gafieira
- Manoel Cambira
- Lourenço Monjolo
- Manioel Cassange
- Joaquim Sigano

Valued at 300$000:

- Albino Dialiga
- João

Valued at 250$000:

- Vicente Panzo
- Antonio Angelo

Valued at 200$000:

- Luiz Carapina
- Manoel Pança
- Anna Muenga
- Paulo Cabinda
- João Maçaroca

Valued at 100$000:

- Paulo Mulato
- Joaquim Cabinda

Valued at 80$000:

- Coima
- Antonio Mina

In the 1878 inventory of Fazenda Resgate, the following enslaved individuals were listed:[1]

- Henrique, 58 years old (carter / wagon driver)
- Jacintho, 51 years old (carpenter)
- Julio, 42 years old (sawyer)
- Sebastião, 51 years old (blacksmith)
- João Franco, 51 years old (mason)
- Euzébio, 46 years old (hewer / timber cutter)
- Satyro, 34 years old (baker)
- Theodoro, 34 years old (shoemaker)
- Clemente, age not recorded (cooper)
