= Pedestal =

Support of a statue or a vase

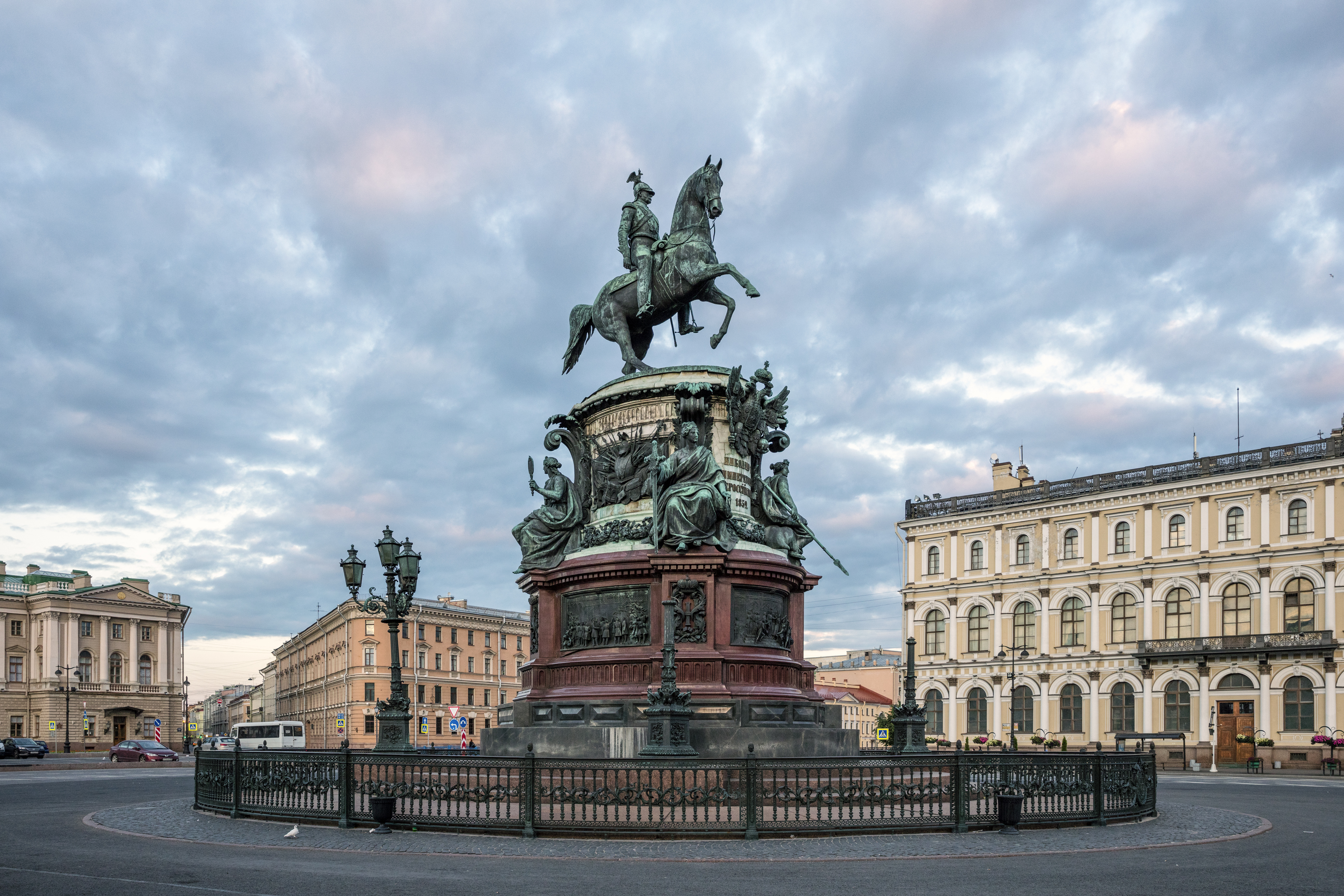
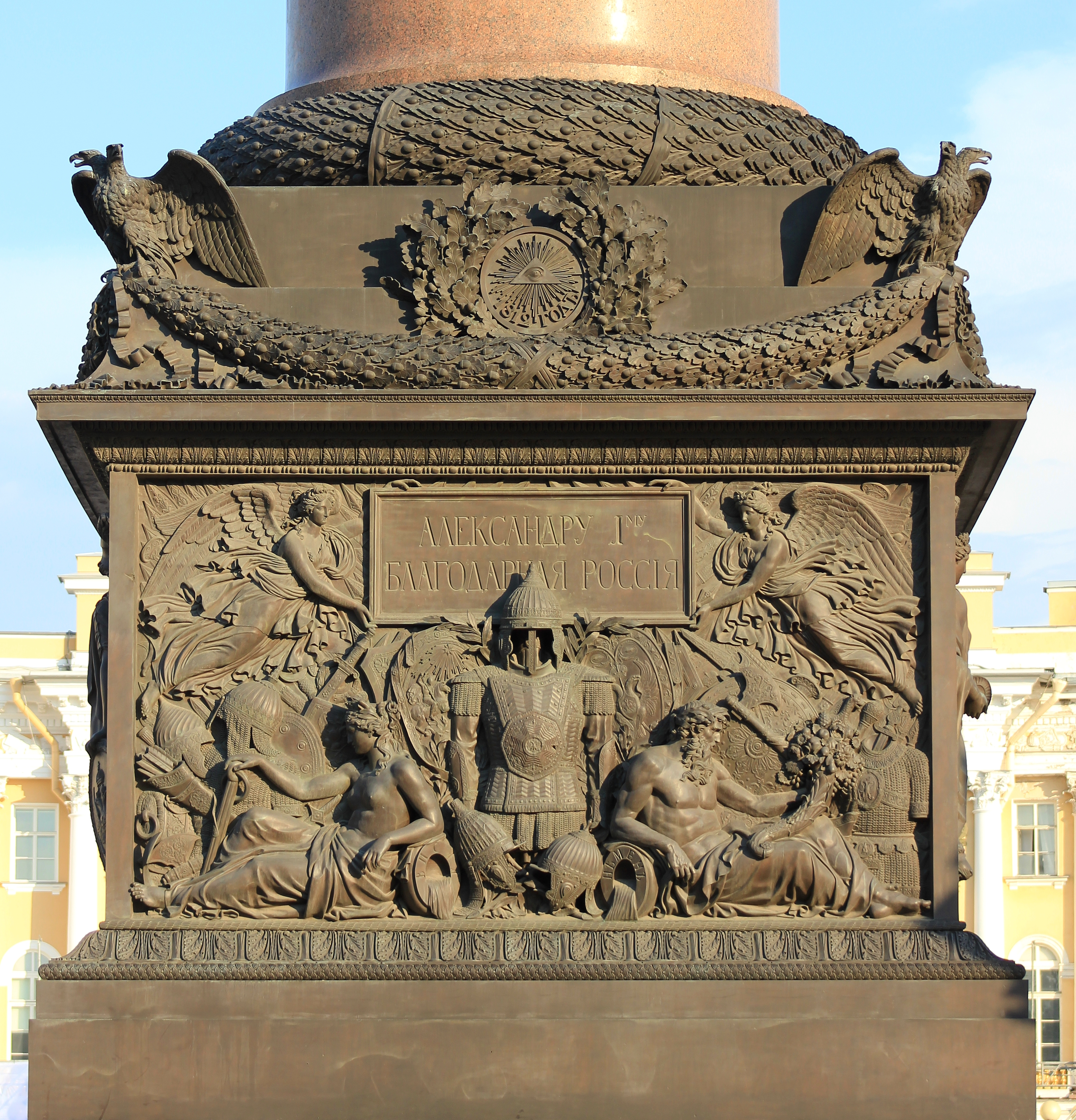
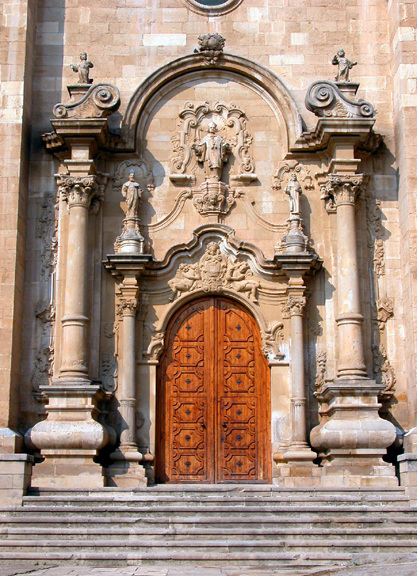
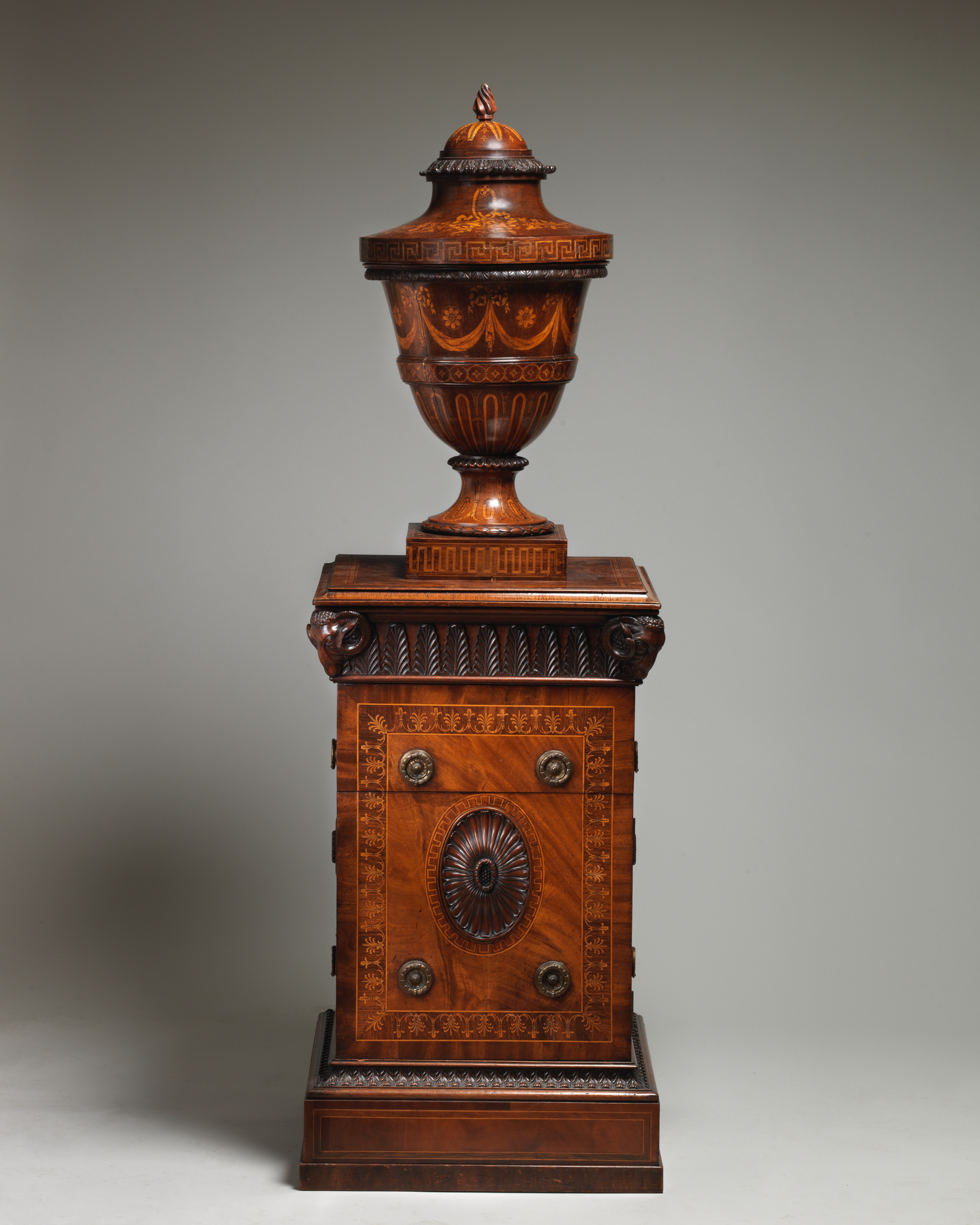
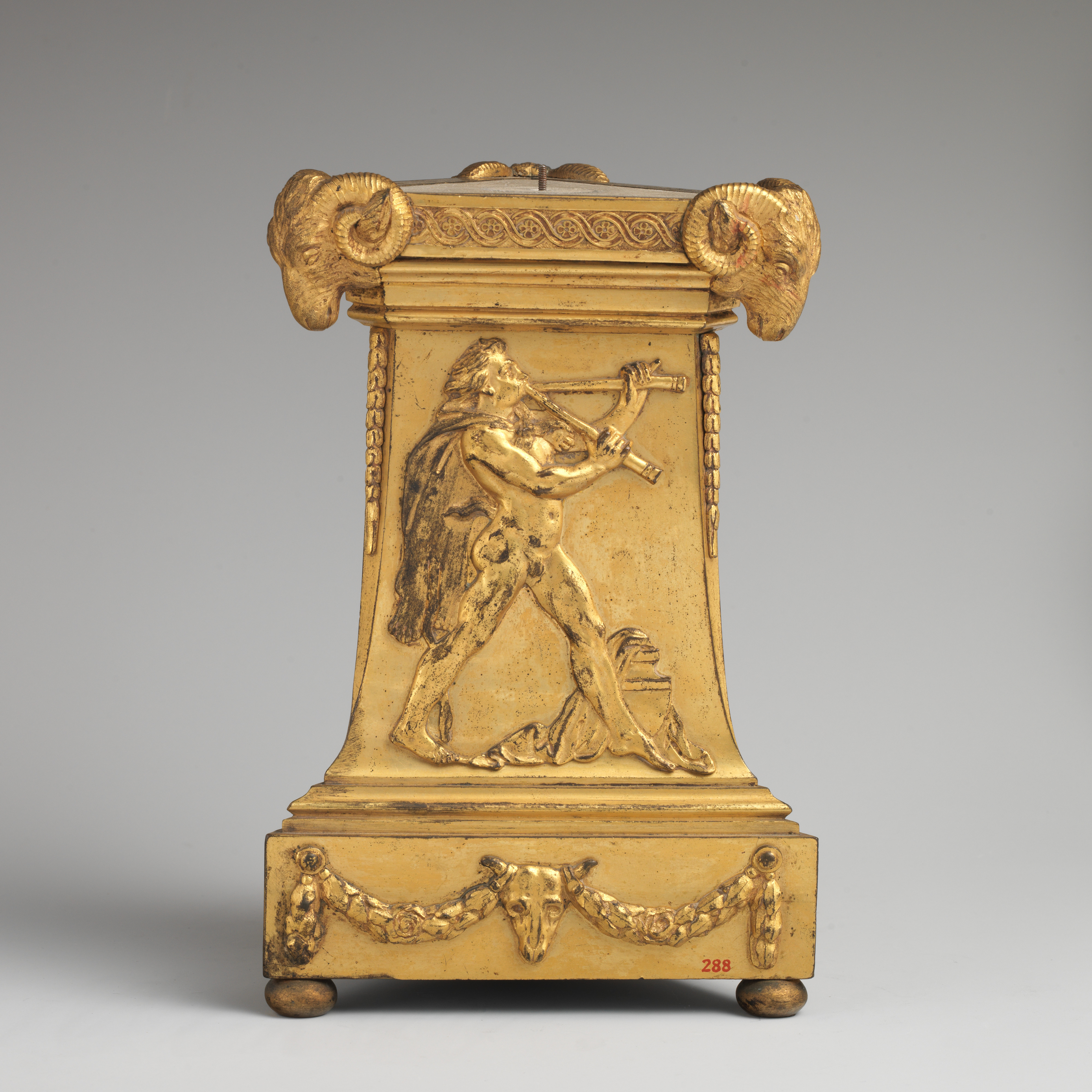
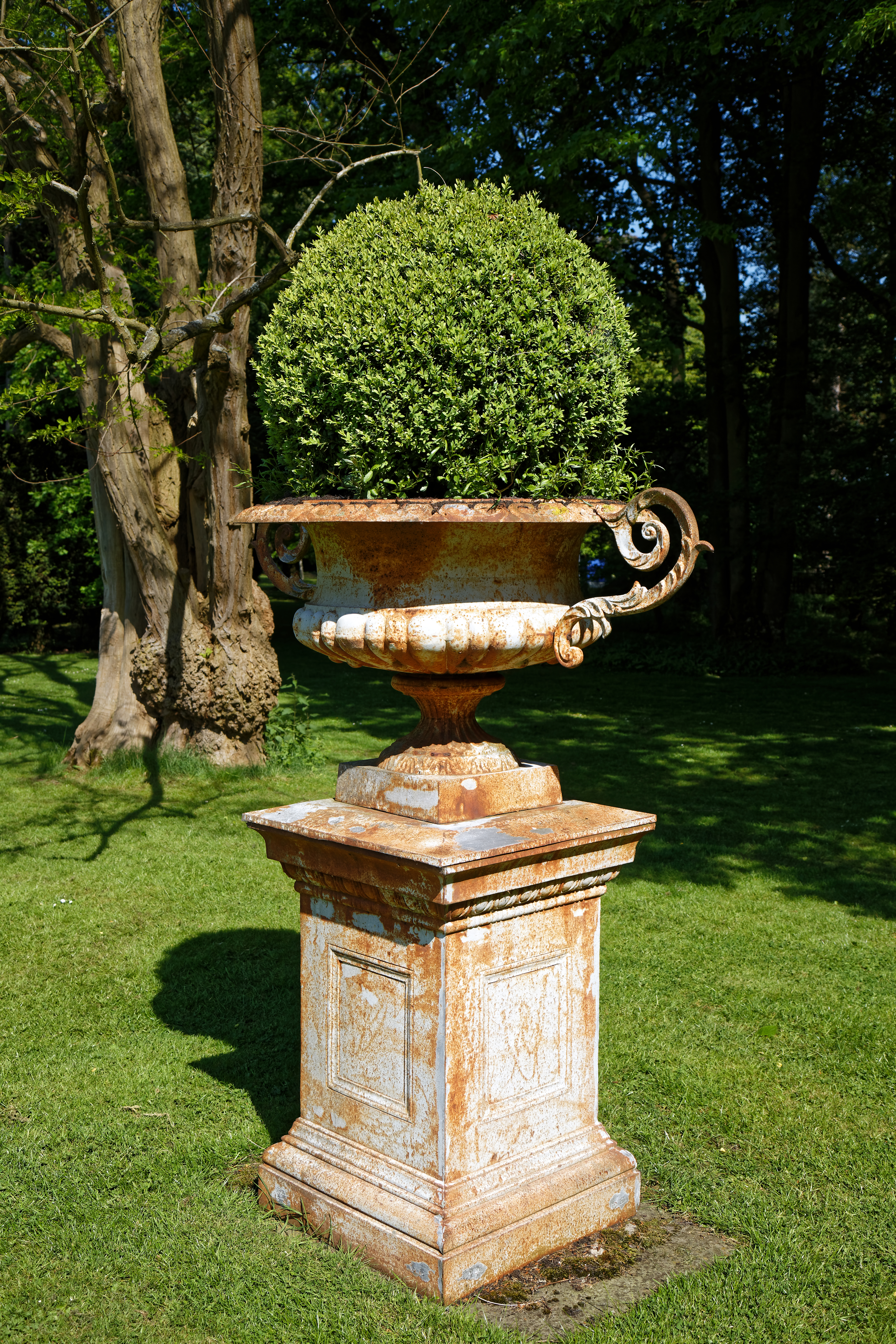
Various examples of pedestals

A pedestal, or plinth is a support at the bottom of a statue, vase, column, or certain altars. Smaller pedestals, especially if round in shape, may be called socles. In civil engineering, it is also called basement. The minimum height of the plinth is usually kept as 45 cm (for buildings). It transmits loads from superstructure to the substructure and acts as the retaining wall for the filling inside the plinth or raised floor.

In sculpting, the terms base, plinth, and pedestal are defined according to their subtle differences. A base is defined as a large mass that supports the sculpture from below. A plinth is defined as a flat and planar support which separates the sculpture from the environment. A pedestal, on the other hand, is defined as a shaft-like form that raises the sculpture and separates it from the base.

An elevated pedestal or plinth that bears a statue, and which is raised from the substructure supporting it (typically roofs or corniches), is sometimes called an acropodium. The term is from Greek ἄκρος ákros 'topmost' and πούς poús (root ποδ- pod-) 'foot'.

== Architecture ==
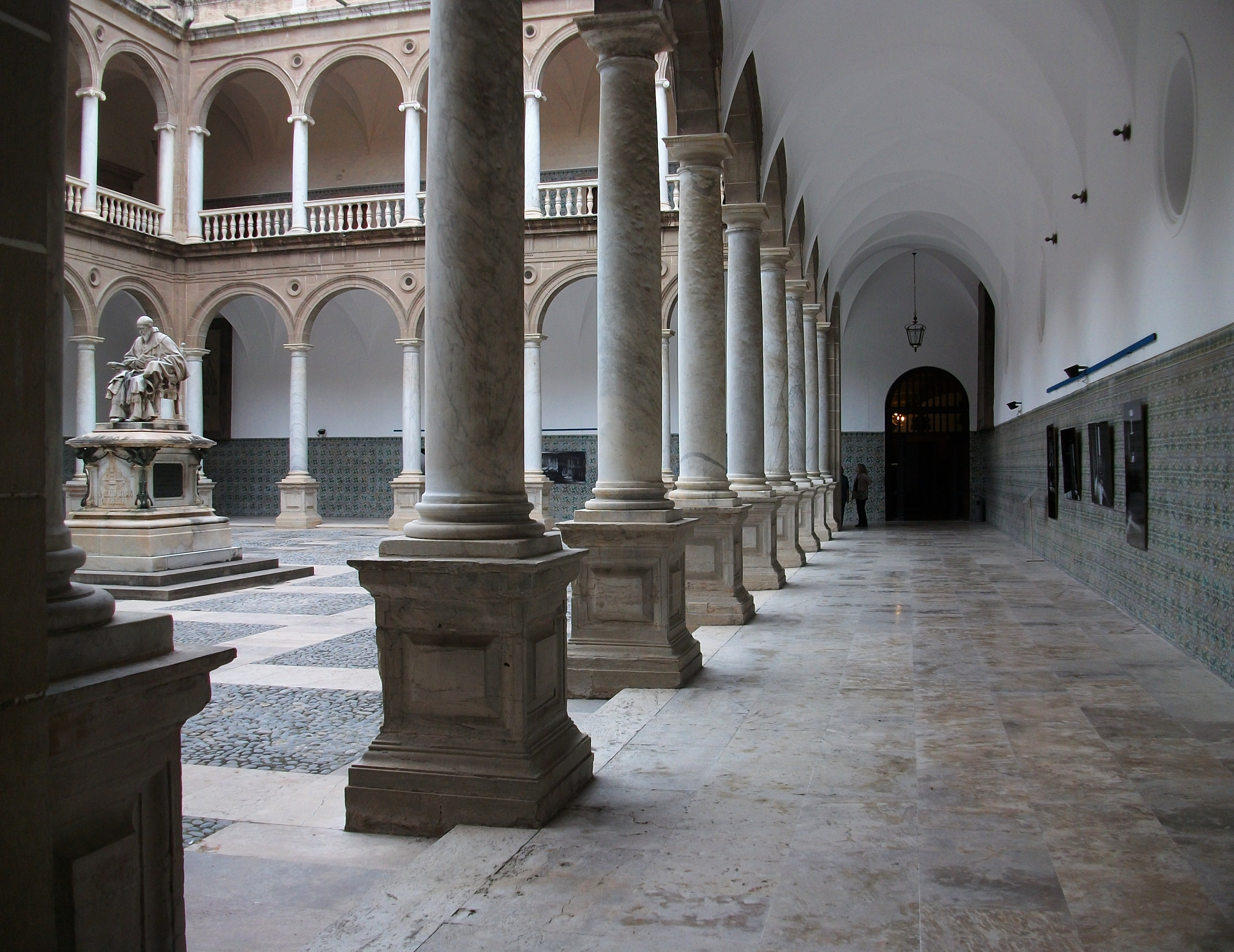
Cloister of Real Colegio Seminario del Corpus Christi, Valencia, showing a colonnade with pedestals

Although in Syria, Asia Minor and Tunisia the Romans occasionally raised the columns of their temples or propylaea on square pedestals, in Rome itself they were employed only to give greater importance to isolated columns, such as those of Trajan and Antoninus, or as a podium to the columns employed decoratively in the Roman triumphal arches.

The architects of the Italian Renaissance, however, conceived the idea that no order was complete without a pedestal, and as the orders were by them employed to divide up and decorate a building in several stories, the cornice of the pedestal was carried through and formed the sills of their windows, or, in open arcades, round a court, the balustrade of the arcade. They also would seem to have considered that the height of the pedestal should correspond in its proportion with that of the column or pilaster it supported; thus in the church of Saint John Lateran, where the applied order is of considerable dimensions, the pedestal is 13 feet (4.0 m) high instead of the ordinary height of 3 to 5 feet (1.5 m).

== Asia ==
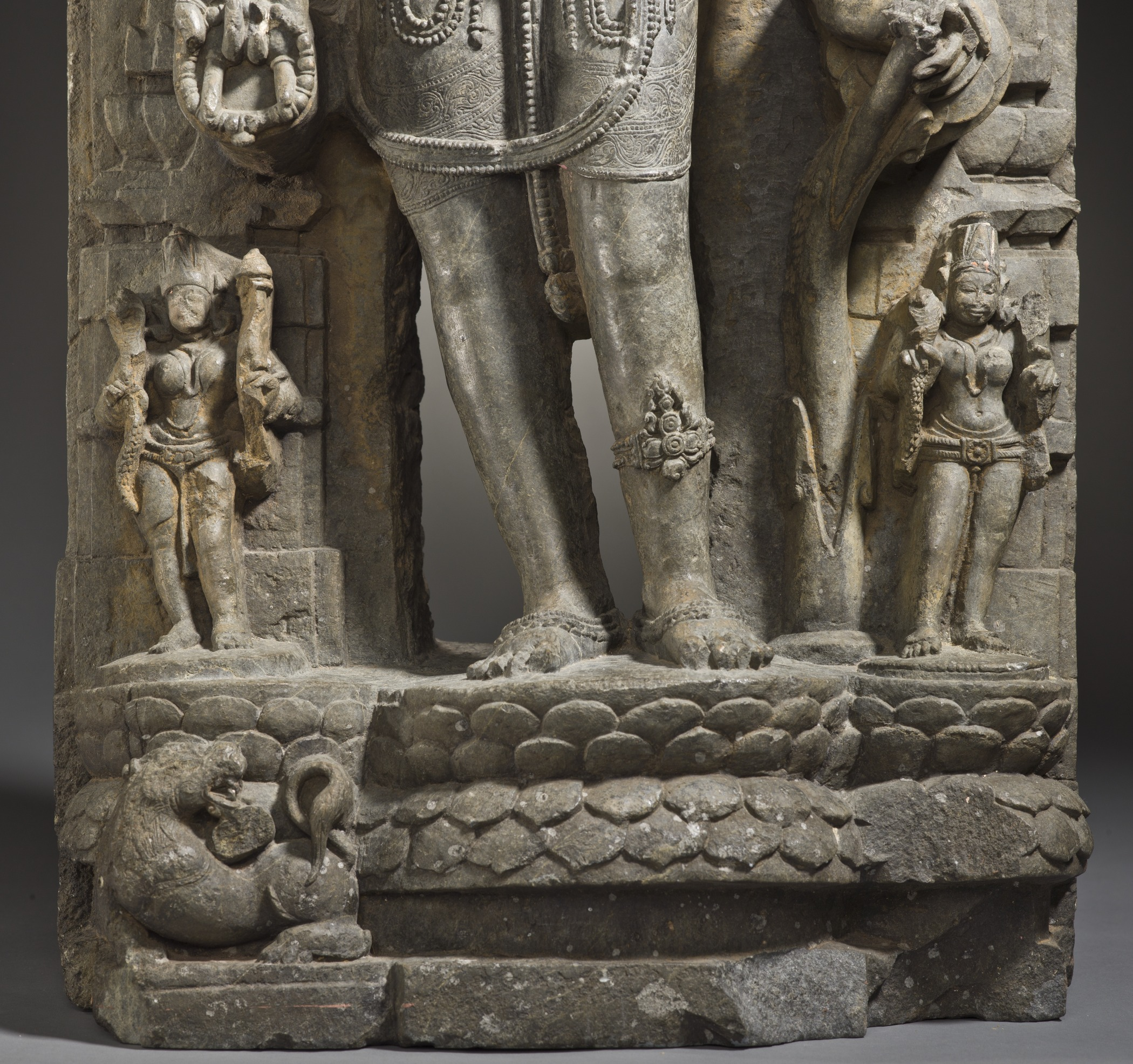
Lotus throne under the Hindu goddess Parvati, 11th century, India

In Asian art a lotus throne is a stylized lotus flower used as the seat or base for a figure. It is the normal pedestal for divine figures in Buddhist art and Hindu art, and often seen in Jain art. Originating in Indian art, it followed Indian religions to East Asia in particular.

In imperial China, a stone tortoise called bixi was traditionally used as the pedestal for important stele, especially those associated with emperors. According to the 1396 version of the regulations issued by the Ming Dynasty founder, the Hongwu Emperor, the highest nobility (those of the gong and hou ranks) and the officials of the top 3 ranks were eligible for bixi-based funerary tablets, while lower-level mandarins' steles were to stand on simple rectangular pedestals.

== See also ==
- Capital – the corresponding structure at the top of a column
- Pedestal desk
- Pedestal table
