= Volunteers Initiative Nepal =

Volunteers Initiative Nepal (VIN) is a volunteering in Nepal non-governmental organization (NGO) established and registered in 2005 in Kathmandu, Nepal by a group of social activists, educationalists, development workers, and other professionals. VIN is a non-religious, non-political, and non-profit organization. VIN focuses on empowerment projects in marginalized communities of Nepal through its programs and projects VIN mobilizes local and international volunteer in Nepal and interns in developmental and humanitarian projects including research, education, training, and counseling.

== Mission ==
To empower marginalized communities through enhanced education, health, environment, economy, and basic infrastructure development through women's empowerment, children's development, youth empowerment, community health, and environment & conservation programs with a special focus on women and children by conducting training and research, mobilizing skilled local and international volunteers to promote equality, economic well-being and basic human rights.

== Partnership ==
VIN is a certified hosting organization. At the local level, VIN works in coordination with District Health Councils, District education offices, District Development Councils, Village Councils, Women, children & youth clubs, Buddhist monasteries, public schools.

== History ==
Bhuprendra Ghimire, its president, founded VIN in 2005 to give back to the community he belongs to. He holds a master's degree in education and was an educator in Nepal for over 10 years before establishing VIN.

VIN initiated on-site community development in 2007 in Jitpur Phedi village, a rural community less than 20 miles from Kathmandu. Since 2007 VIN has built strong foundations of education, health & environment, basic economy, and basic public infrastructure for the communities including schools, community centers, early childhood education centers, WASH. VIN has been implementing its holistic projects in the outskirts of Kathmandu, Tarkeshor Municipality, and Okhaldhunga district of Everest region. VIN is currently in the setup stages to expand volunteer placement and community development to Dhading, Rashuwa & Sindhupalchok too, rural communities from 50 to 250 miles from Kathmandu.

== Programs ==
VIN has four pillars of its development initiatives – education, health and environment, economy, and basic infrastructure development. To achieve their mission they implement six different programs: Women's Empowerment, Children's Development, Youth Empowerment, Public Health & Medical Care, Environment Conservation, and Disaster Response & Relief.

VIN offers international, local volunteer and internship placements in various projects. Current programs include women and youth empowerment, children's development, teaching, teacher development, environment and conservation, public health, management and administration, and journalism and public interest.

Their program runs year-round by their local staff, volunteers and interns. The projects are developed based on the local need by conducting a baseline survey and principles of Sustainable Development Goals (SDGs). Their projects are monitored and evaluated using external bodies so as to ensure the impact and quality of the services delivered to the community.

== Earthquake Relief Project ==
VIN has been actively involved in relief work after the 25 April 2015 earthquake. VIN distributed immediate relief materials like tents, food & other essentials, organized mobile medical camps, children creative psychological camps and constructed 550 safe transitional houses, 2500+ toilets for the affected families, and 50 classrooms for the affected children to go to school. VIN has also built 55 earthquake-resistant homes and 5 per-schools for the affected communities.

== Volunteers ==
VIN's holistic approach of community development allows the volunteer or intern to be immersed in the local culture. Interns and volunteers of various educational and cultural backgrounds can exchange their cultures freely.
