= Fubá (disambiguation) =

Fubá is a generic term in Brazilian Portuguese for flour, whether it be rice, cassava, or maize flour.

Fubá may also refer to:

- Gilmar Fubá, Brazilian footballer
- Tico-Tico no Fubá, Brazilian song
- Tico-Tico no Fubá (film), Brazilian film
