= Substructure =

Substructure may refer to:

- Substructure (engineering)
- Substructure (mathematics)
- Substructure (marxist theory)
