= Seismic base isolation =

Means of protecting a structure against earthquake

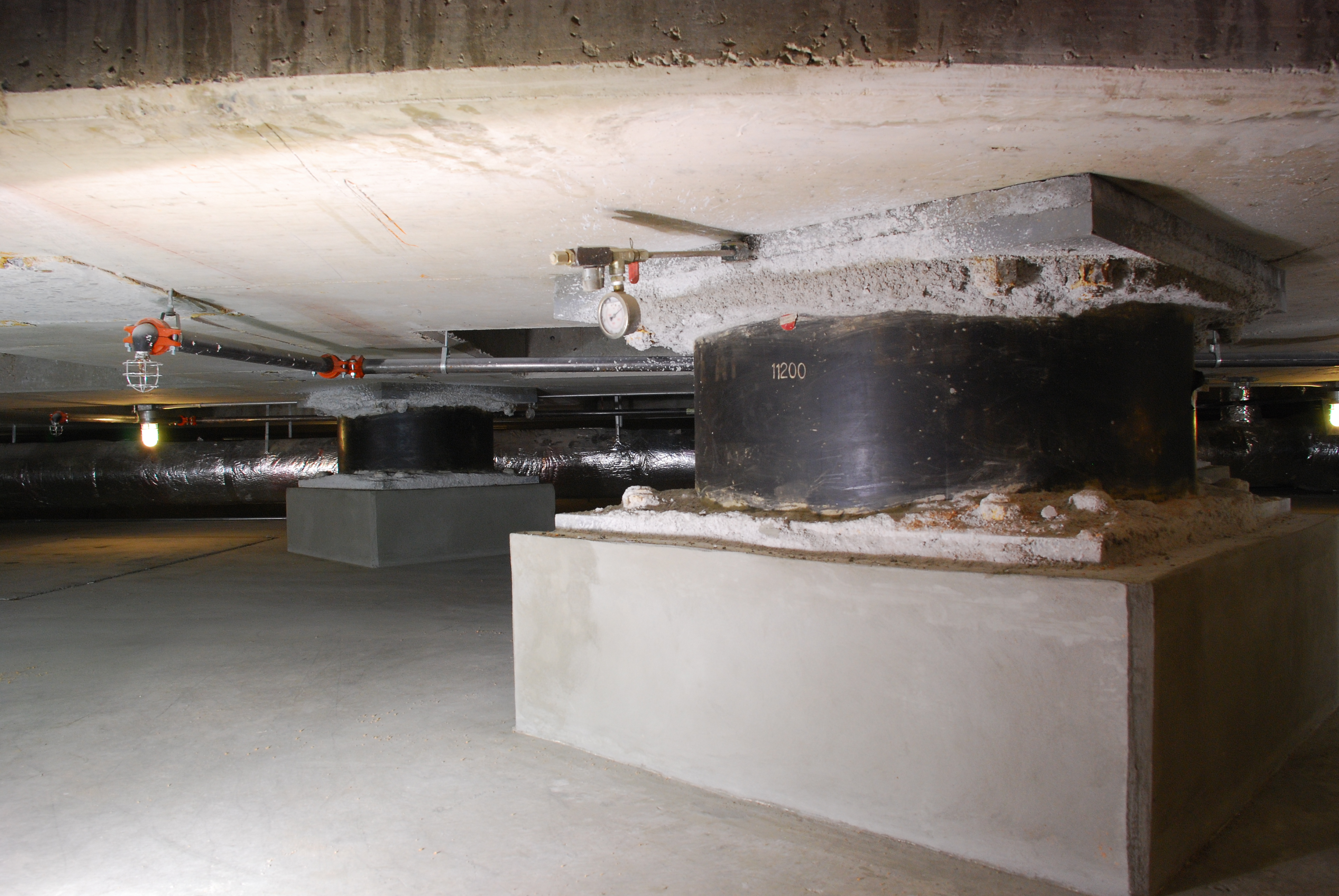
The base isolators under the Utah State Capitol building

Concurrent shake-table testing of two building models. The right one is equipped with a seismic base isolation

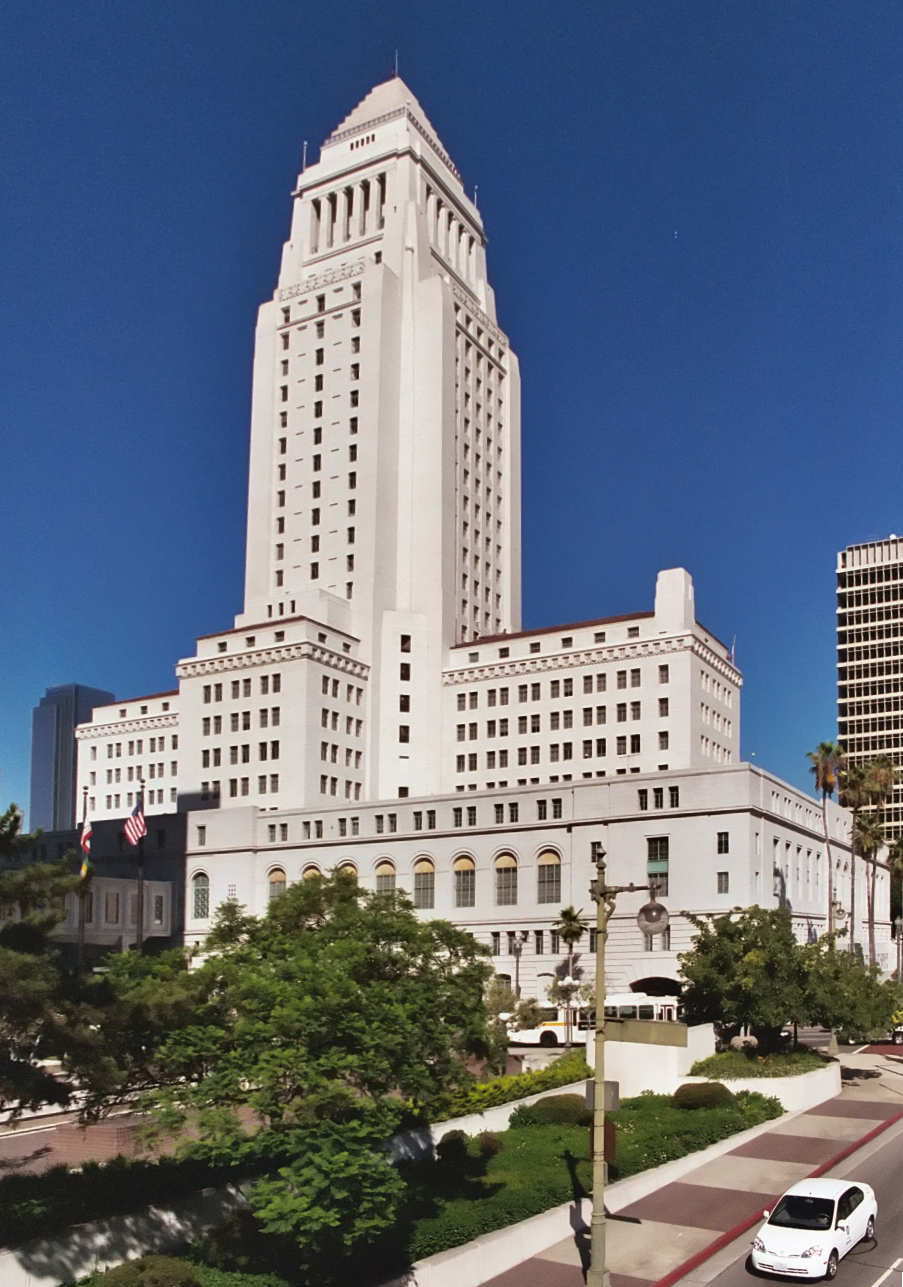
LA City Hall, to be retrofitted with base isolation

Seismic base isolation, also known as base isolation, or base isolation system, is one of the most popular means of protecting a structure against earthquake forces. It is a collection of structural elements which should substantially decouple a superstructure from its substructure that is in turn resting on the shaking ground, thus protecting a building or non-building structure's integrity.

Base isolation is one of the most powerful tools of earthquake engineering pertaining to the passive structural vibration control technologies. The isolation can be obtained by the use of various techniques like rubber bearings, friction bearings, ball bearings, spring systems and other means. It is meant to enable a building or non-building structure to survive a potentially devastating seismic impact through a proper initial design or subsequent modifications. In some cases, application of base isolation can raise both a structure's seismic performance and its seismic sustainability considerably. Contrary to popular belief, base isolation does not make a building earthquake proof.

Base isolation system consists of isolation units with or without isolation components, where:

1. Isolation units are the basic elements of a base isolation system which are intended to provide the aforementioned decoupling effect to a building or non-building structure.
2. Isolation components are the connections between isolation units and their parts having no decoupling effect of their own.

Base isolation devices could consist of elastometric or sliding devices.

This technology can be used for both new structural design and seismic retrofit. In process of seismic retrofit, some of the most prominent U.S. monuments, e.g. Pasadena City Hall, San Francisco City Hall, Salt Lake City and County Building or LA City Hall were mounted on base isolation systems. It required creating rigidity diaphragms and moats around the buildings, as well as making provisions against overturning and P-Delta Effect.

Base isolation is also used on a smaller scale—sometimes down to a single room in a building. Isolated raised-floor systems are used to safeguard essential equipment against earthquakes. The technique has been incorporated to protect statues and other works of art—see, for instance, Rodin's Gates of Hell at the National Museum of Western Art in Tokyo's Ueno Park.

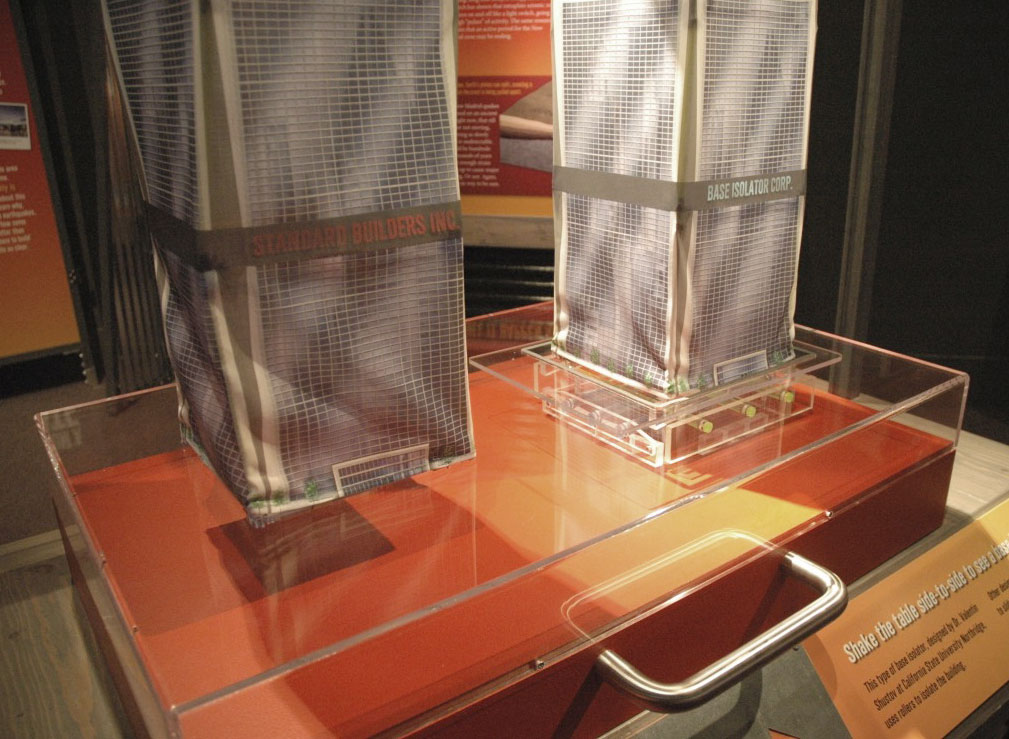
Base isolation demonstration at The Field Museum in Chicago

Base isolation units consist of Linear-motion bearings, that allow the building to move, oil dampers that absorb the forces generated by the movement of the building, and laminated rubber bearings that allow the building to return to its original position when the earthquake has ended.

== History ==
Base isolator bearings were pioneered in New Zealand by Dr Bill Robinson during the 1970s. The bearing, which consists of layers of rubber and steel with a lead core, was invented by Dr Robinson in 1974. Later, in 2018, the technology was commercialized by Kamalakannan Ganesan and subsequently made patent-free, allowing for broader access and application of this earthquake-resistant technology The earliest uses of base isolation systems date back all the way to 550 B.C. in the construction of the Tomb of Cyrus the Great in Pasargadae, Iran. More than 90% of Iran's territory, including this historic site, is located in the Alpine-Himalaya belt, which is one of the Earth's most active seismic zones. Historians discovered that this structure, predominantly composed of limestone, was designed to have two foundations. The first and lower foundation, composed of stones that were bonded together with a lime plaster and sand mortar, known as saroj mortar, was designed to move in the case of an earthquake. The top foundation layer, which formed a large plate that was in no way attached to the structure's base, was composed of polished stones. The reason this second foundation was not tied down to the base was that in the case of an earthquake, this plate-like layer would be able to slide freely over the structure's first foundation. As historians discovered thousands of years later, this system worked exactly as its designers had predicted, and as a result, the Tomb of Cyrus the Great still stands today. The development of the idea of base isolation can be divided into two eras. In ancient times the isolation was performed through the construction of multilayered cut stones (or by laying sand or gravel under the foundation) while in recent history, beside layers of gravel or sand as an isolation interface, wooden logs between the ground and the foundation are used.

== Research ==
Through the George E. Brown, Jr. Network for Earthquake Engineering Simulation (NEES), researchers are studying the performance of base isolation systems. The project, a collaboration among researchers at University of Nevada, Reno; University of California, Berkeley; University of Wisconsin, Green Bay; and the University at Buffalo is conducting a strategic assessment of the economic, technical, and procedural barriers to the widespread adoption of seismic isolation in the United States. NEES resources have been used for experimental and numerical simulation, data mining, networking and collaboration to understand the complex interrelationship among the factors controlling the overall performance of an isolated structural system. This project involves earthquake shaking table and hybrid tests at the NEES experimental facilities at the University of California, Berkeley, and the University at Buffalo, aimed at understanding ultimate performance limits to examine the propagation of local isolation failures (e.g., bumping against stops, bearing failures, uplift) to the system level response. These tests will include a full-scale, three-dimensional test of an isolated 5-story steel building on the E-Defense shake table in Miki, Hyōgo, Japan. Seismic isolation research in the middle and late 1970s was largely predicated on the observation that most strong-motion records recorded up to that time had very low spectral acceleration values (2 sec) in the long-period range. Records obtained from lakebed sites in the 1985 Mexico City earthquake raised concerns of the possibility of resonance, but such examples were considered exceptional and predictable. One of the early examples of the earthquake design strategy is the one given by Dr. J.A. Calantariens in 1909. It was proposed that the building can be built on a layer of fine sand, mica or talc that would allow the building to slide in an earthquake, thereby reducing the forces transmitted to building. A detailed literature review of semi-active control systems Michael D. Symans et al. (1999) provides references to both theoretical and experimental research but concentrates on describing the results of experimental work. Specifically, the review focuses on descriptions of the dynamic behavior and distinguishing features of various systems which have been experimentally tested both at the component level and within small scale structural models.

== Adaptive base isolation ==
An adaptive base isolation system includes a tunable isolator that can adjust its properties based on the input to minimize the transferred vibration. Magnetorheological fluid dampers and isolators with Magnetorheological elastomer have been suggested as adaptive base isolators.

== Notable buildings and structures on base isolation systems ==
- Tomb of Cyrus
- LA City Hall
- Oakland City Hall
- Pasadena City Hall
- San Francisco City Hall
- California Palace of the Legion of Honor in San Francisco
- M. H. de Young Memorial Museum in San Francisco
- Asian Art Museum in San Francisco
- James R. Browning United States Court of Appeals Building in San Francisco
- San Francisco International Airport's International Terminal, one of the largest base-isolated structures in the world
- Salt Lake City and County Building
- Başakşehir Çam and Sakura City Hospital in Istanbul
- Sabiha Gökçen International Airport's main terminal, currently the largest seismically isolated structure in the world
- New Zealand Parliament Buildings in Wellington
- Museum of New Zealand Te Papa Tongarewa in Wellington
- Salt Lake Temple of the Church of Jesus Christ of Latter-day Saints in Salt Lake City (undergoing seismic renovation 2019–2026)
- BAPS Shri Swaminarayan Mandir Chino Hills, the first earthquake-proof Hindu temple in the world
- Apple Park

== See also ==
- Earthquake-resistant structures
- Geotechnical seismic isolation
- Geotechnical engineering
- Seismic retrofit
- Shock absorber
- Shock mount
- Vibration isolation
