= Steel plate shear wall =

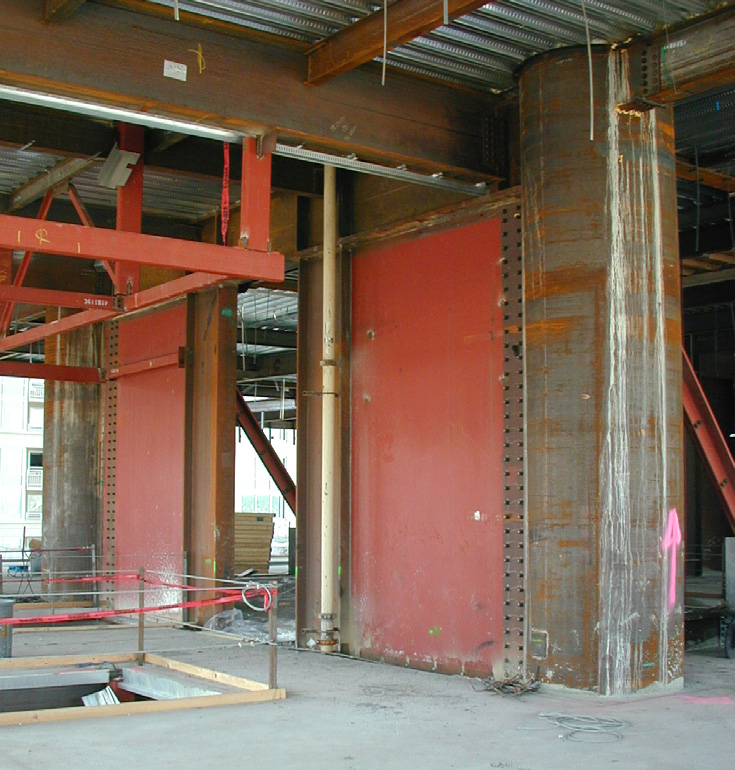
A coupled steel plate shear wall.

A steel plate shear wall (SPSW) consists of steel infill plates bounded by boundary elements.

== Overview ==
They constitute an SPSW. Its behavior is analogous to a vertical plate girder cantilevered from its base. Similar to plate girders, the SPW system optimizes component performance by taking advantage of the post-buckling behavior of the steel infill panels. An SPW frame can be idealized as a vertical cantilever plate girder, in which the steel plates act as the web, the columns act as the flanges and the cross beams represent the transverse stiffeners. The theory that governs plate design should not be used in the design of SPW structures since the relatively high bending strength and stiffness of the beams and columns have a significant effect on the post-buckling behavior.

Capacity design of structures is: to control failure in a building by pre-selecting localized ductile fuses (or weak links) to act as the primary location for energy dissipation when a building is subjected to extreme loading. The structure is designed such that all inelastic action (or damage) occurs at these critical locations (the fuses), which are designed to behave in a ductile and stable manner. Conversely, all other structural elements are protected against failure or collapse by limiting the load transfer to these elements to the yield capacity of the fuses. In SPSWs, the infill plates are meant to serve as the fuse elements. When damaged during an extreme loading event, they can be replaced at a reasonable cost and restore the full integrity of the building. In general, SPWs are categorized based on their performance, selection of structural and load-bearing systems, and the presence of perforations or stiffeners (Table 1).

A significant amount of valuable research has been performed on the static and dynamic behavior of SPSWs. Much research has been conducted to not only help determine the behavior, response and performance of SPWs under cyclic and dynamic loading, but also as a means to help advance analysis and design methodologies for the engineering community.

The pioneering work of Kulak and co-investigators at the University of Alberta in Canada led to a simplified method for analyzing a thin unstiffened SPSW – the strip model. This model is incorporated in Chapter 20 of the most recent Canadian Steel Design Standard (CAN/CSA S16-01) and the National Earthquake Hazard Reduction Program (NEHRP) provisions in the US.

Table 1. Categorization of steel plate walls based on performance characteristics and expectations

Performance characteristic	Performance expectations or SPW characteristics
Type of Loading carried by SPW	Lateral Load Only / Lateral Load + Wall's Dead Load (or so called 50% Gravity Load)/ Gravity + Lateral Loads
Structural System	Single wall with and without infill Columns / Coupled wall with and without infill Columns
Stiffener Spacing and Size	Post-Buckling effect can be seen in the sub panels / Panel buckles with the stiffeners globally / Stiffeners produces sub-panels which can be categorized as thick panel
Web Plate Behavior	Web plate yields before critical elastic buckling occurs (thick plate) / Web plate buckles elastically, develops post-buckling tension field, then yields (thin plate)
Web Plate Perforations	With perforations / Without perforations

== History ==
In the past two decades the steel plate shear wall (SPSW), also known as the steel plate wall (SPW), has been used in a number of buildings in Japan and North America as part of the lateral force resisting system. In earlier days, SPSWs were treated like vertically oriented plate girders and design procedures tended to be very conservative. Web buckling was prevented through extensive stiffening or by selecting an appropriately thick web plate, until more information became available on the post-buckling characteristics of web plates. Although the plate girder theory seems appropriate for the design of an SPW structure, a very important difference is the relatively high bending strength and stiffness of the beams and columns that form the boundary elements of the wall. These members are expected to have a significant effect on the overall behaviour of a building incorporating this type of system and several researchers have focused on this aspect of SPWs. The energy dissipating qualities of the web plate under extreme cyclic loading has raised the prospect of using SPSWs as a promising alternative to conventional systems in high-risk seismic regions. A further benefit is that the diagonal tension field of the web plate acts like a diagonal brace in a braced frame and thus completes the truss action, which is known to be an efficient means to control wind drift.

== Advantages ==
From a designer's point of view, steel plate walls have become a very attractive alternative to other steel systems, or to replace reinforced concrete elevator cores and shear wall. In comparative studies it has been shown that the overall costs of a building can be reduced significantly when considering the following advantages:

- An SPW system, when designed and detailed properly, has relatively large energy dissipation capability with stable hysteretic behaviour, thus being very attractive for high risk earthquake zones.
- Because the web tension field acts much like a diagonal brace, an SPW system has relatively high initial stiffness, and is thus very effective in limiting wind drift.
- Compared to reinforced concrete shear walls, SPWs are much lighter, which ultimately reduces the demand on columns and foundations, and reduces the seismic load, which is proportional to the mass of the structure.
- Compared to reinforced concrete construction, the erection process of an all-steel building is significantly faster, thus reducing the construction duration, which is an important factor affecting the overall cost of a project.
- By using shop-welded, field-bolted SPWs, field inspection is improved and a high level of quality control can be achieved.
- For architects, the increased versatility and space savings because of the smaller cross-section of SPWs, compared to reinforced concrete shear walls, is a distinct benefit, especially in high-rise buildings, where reinforced concrete shear walls in lower floors become very thick and occupy a large proportion of the floor plan.
- All-steel construction with SPWs is a practical and efficient solution for cold regions where concrete construction may not be feasible, as very low temperatures complicate construction and freeze-thaw cycles can result in durability problems.
- In seismic retrofit applications, SPWs are typically much easier and faster to install than reinforced concrete shear walls, which is a critical issue when building occupancy needs to be maintained throughout the construction time.
- In the event of inelastic response, steel panels are more readily replaced, and repairs are otherwise more simple than for equivalent reinforced-concrete systems.

In comparison with conventional bracing systems, steel panels have the advantage of being a redundant, continuous system exhibiting relatively stable and ductile behaviour under severe cyclic loading (Tromposch and Kulak, 1987). This benefit along with the high stiffness of the plates acting like tension braces to maintain stability, strongly qualifies the SPW as an ideal energy dissipation system in high risk seismic regions, while providing an efficient system to reduce lateral drift. Thus, some of the advantages of using SPWs compared with conventional bracing systems are as follows:

- Reduces seismic force demand due to higher SPW ductility characteristics and inherent redundancy and continuity
- Accelerates structural steel erection by using shop-welded and field-bolted steel panels, and thus, less inspection and reduced quality control costs
- Permits efficient design of lateral-resisting systems by distributing large forces evenly.

A steel plate shear element consists of steel infill plates bounded by a column-beam system. When these infill plates occupy each level within a framed bay of a structure, they constitute an SPW. Its behaviour is analogous to a vertical plate girder cantilevered from its base. Similar to plate girders, the SPW system optimizes component performance by taking advantage of the post-buckling behaviour of the steel infill panels. An SPW frame can be idealized as a vertical cantilever plate girder, in which the steel plates act as the web, the columns act as the flanges and the cross beams1 represent the transverse stiffeners. The theory that governs the design of plate girders for buildings proposed by Basler in 1960, should not be used in the design of SPW structures since the relatively high bending strength and stiffness of the beams and columns are expected to have a significant effect on the post-buckling behaviour. However, Basler's theory could be used as a basis to derive an analytical model for SPW systems.

Designers pioneering the use of SPWs did not have much experience nor existing data to rely upon. Typically, web plate design failed to consider post-buckling behaviour under shear, thus ignoring the advantage of the tension field and its added benefits for drift control and shear resistance. Furthermore, the inelastic deformation capacity of this highly redundant system had not been utilized, also ignoring the significant energy dissipation capability that is of great importance for buildings in high-risk seismic zones. One of the first researchers to investigate the behaviour of SPWs more closely was Kulak at the University of Alberta. Since the early 1980s, his team conducted both analytical and experimental research focused on developing design procedures suitable for drafting design standards (Driver et al., 1997, Thorburn et al., 1983, Timler and Kulak, 1983, and Tromposch and Kulak, 1987). Recent research in the United States by Astaneh (2001) supports the assertion by Canadian academia that unstiffened plate, post-buckling behaviour acts as a capable shear resisting system.

== Analytical models ==
There are two different modelling techniques:

- Strip Model
- Modified Plate-Frame Interaction (M-PFI) model

The strip model represents shear panels as a series of inclined strip elements, capable of transmitting tension forces only, and oriented in the same direction as the average principal tensile stresses in the panel. By replacing a plate panel with struts, the resulting steel structure can be analyzed using currently available commercial computer analysis software. Research conducted at the University of British Columbia by Rezai et al. (1999) showed that the strip model is significantly incompatible and inaccurate for a wide range of SPW arrangements.

The strip model is limited mostly to SPSWs with thin plates (low critical buckling capacity) and certain ratios. In the development of this model, no solution has been provided for a perforated SPSW, shear walls with thick steel plates and shear walls with stiffeners. The strip model concept, although appropriate for practical analysis of thin plates, is not directly applicable to other types of plates. Moreover, its implementations have yet to be incorporated in commonly used commercial computer analysis software.

In order to overcome this limitation, a general method was developed for the analysis and design of SPWs within different configurations, including walls with or without openings, with thin or thick plates, and with or without stiffeners. This method considers the behavior of the steel plate and frame separately, and accounts for the interaction of these two elements, which leads to a more rational engineering design of an SPSW system. However, this model has serious shortcomings when the flexural behavior of an SPSW needs to be properly accounted for, such as the case of a slender tall building.

Modified Plate-Frame Interaction (M-PFI) model is based upon an existing shear model originally presented by Roberts and Sabouri-Ghomi (1992). Sabouri-Ghomi, Ventura and Kharrazi (2005) further refined the model and named it the Plate-Frame Interaction (PFI) model. In this paper, the PFI analytical model is then further enhanced by ‘modifying’ the load-displacement diagram to include the effect of overturning moments on the SPW response, hence the given name of the M-PFI model. The method also addresses bending and shear interactions of the plastic ultimate capacity of steel panels, as well as bending and shear interactions of the ultimate yield strength for each individual component, that is the steel plate and surrounding frame.

== See also ==
- Buckling
- Earthquake-resistant structures
- Steel Girder
