= Cobu =

Brazilian dessert

- Alternative names: Cubu, Pau a pique, João Deitado
- Type: Cake
- Place of origin: Gouveia
- Region or state: Minas Gerais

Cobu (Note: Sometimes spelled Kobú.) or Cubu, also known as Pau a pique or João Deitado, is a traditional Brazilian dessert consisting of a bolo de fubá cooked in a banana leaf. The dish can be found throughout the Brazilian state of Minas Gerais.

== History ==
The dish was developed in the early 18th century by Cobu slaves in Gouveia, Minas Gerais. The original dish was a tough cake made of fubá and sugarcane molasses and cooked over an open fire called kpodógbà (Note: Today, kpodógbà or klέklέ kpodógbà refers to a tough galette made from cornmeal.) or kpógbà in Fon. This West African dish that was eaten as a slave food in Brazil was adapted into its modern-form after the addition of higher-quality ingredients such as milk, butter, cheese, cloves, cinnamon, and rapadura. Brazilian ethnolinguist Yeda Pessoa de Castro theorized that the dessert began to be known as Cobu or Cubu after its commercialization by Mina and Cobu slaves. Cobu was further refined to include coalhada, fat, and eggs to make it more palatable for White Brazilians and eventually took its current form as a bolo de fubá, wrapped in a banana leaf, and cooked in a clay oven.

=== Cultural impact ===
The Brazilian municipality of Gouveia calls itself the "Land of Cobu" (Terra do Cobu) and is a destination for tourists who want to try the dessert. Cobu is the city symbol of Gouveia and many businesses and organizations in the city, such as samba schools, social clubs, gas stations, and supermarkets, feature Cobu in their names.

Cobu can be found at festivals and events in Minas Gerais such as the annual Congonhas Quitanda Festival (Festival da Quitanda de Congonhas) in the Brazilian municipality of Congonhas. Kobufest, an annual artisanal good festival in Gouveia, is named after Cobu.
