= Seismic response of landfill =

Relationship between landfills and seismic activity

Solid waste landfills can be affected by seismic activity. The tension in a landfill liner rises significantly during an earthquake, and can lead to stretching or tearing of the material. The top of the landfill may crack, and methane collection systems can be moved relative to the cover.

Increasing the depth of a waste column typically leads to a decrease in the ground acceleration felt at the surface of that landfill during an earthquake. The weight of waste is important in the analysis of landfill liner puncture and pipe crushing during an earthquake. Unstable rock under landfills such as limestone may yield during an earthquake, leading to a partial collapse of the fill. A major concern in this case would be the potential contamination of water sources that may be located below the landfill.

== Modeling ==
In a pseudostatic slope stability analysis, the earthquake is modeled as a constant horizontal force. The fact that the earthquake force is modeled as a constant force acting in one direction, represents this model's major limitation. In a Newmark permanent deformation mathematical analysis, movement of a landfill occurs when a driving force on the landfill is greater than its resisting force. A shaking table laboratory test works to explore the strength characteristics at interfaces between different components of the landfill. Of primary concern is the contact between soil and landfill liner, as this is usually considered to be a weak point in the system. A dynamic centrifuge test works to model the landfill in a scaled-down form. Typically in this approach, a small simplified landfill is constructed in a test box. During this testing, earthquake loading is simulated on the sample landfill. A major application of this type of testing is to observe the behavior of landfill liners during ground shaking.

The uniqueness of many landfills makes it difficult to apply test results from one site to another. Measuring properties of landfills such as waste unit weight could lead to health concerns, as the handling of waste could be dangerous. Accessing this waste would likely involve damaging the cover liner, which could compromise the ability of the system to function properly. Landfills are systems which change over time, so periodic evaluations may be necessary.
