= Earthquake-resistant structures =

Structures designed to protect buildings from earthquakes

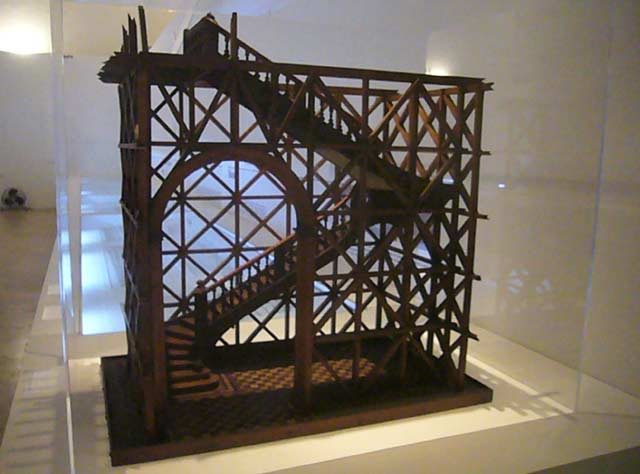
Model of the Gaiola pombalina (pombaline cage), an architectural, earthquake-resistant wooden structure developed in Portugal in the 18th century for the reconstruction of Lisbon's pombaline downtown after the devastating 1755 Lisbon earthquake

Earthquake-resistant or aseismic structures are designed to protect buildings to some or greater extent from earthquakes. While no structure can be entirely impervious to earthquake damage, the goal of earthquake engineering is to erect structures that fare better during seismic activity than their conventional counterparts. According to building codes, earthquake-resistant structures are intended to withstand the largest earthquake of a certain probability that is likely to occur at their location. This means the loss of life should be minimized by preventing collapse of the buildings for rare earthquakes while the loss of the functionality should be limited for more frequent ones.

To combat earthquake destruction, the only method available to ancient architects was to build their landmark structures to last, often by making them excessively stiff and strong.

Currently, there are several design philosophies in earthquake engineering, making use of experimental results, computer simulations and observations from past earthquakes to offer the required performance for the seismic threat at the site of interest. These range from appropriately sizing the structure to be strong and ductile enough to survive the shaking with an acceptable damage, to equipping it with base isolation or using structural vibration control technologies to minimize any forces and deformations. While the former is the method typically applied in most earthquake-resistant structures, important facilities, landmarks and cultural heritage buildings use the more advanced (and expensive) techniques of isolation or control to survive strong shaking with minimal damage. Examples of such applications are the Cathedral of Our Lady of the Angels and the Acropolis Museum.

== Trends and projects ==
Some of the new trends and/or projects in the field of earthquake engineering structures are presented.

=== Building materials ===
Based on studies in New Zealand, relating to 2011 Christchurch earthquakes, precast concrete designed and installed in accordance with modern codes performed well. According to the Earthquake Engineering Research Institute, precast panel buildings had good durability during an earthquake in Armenia, compared to precast frame-panels.

=== Earthquake shelter ===
One Japanese construction company has developed a six-foot cubical shelter, presented as an alternative to earthquake-proofing an entire building.

=== Concurrent shake-table testing ===
Concurrent shake-table testing of two or more building models is an effective way to validate earthquake engineering solutions experimentally.

Thus, two wooden houses built before adoption of the 1981 Japanese Building Code were moved to E-Defense for testing. One house was reinforced to enhance its seismic resistance, while the other one was not. These two models were set on E-Defense platform and tested simultaneously.

=== Combined vibration control solution ===
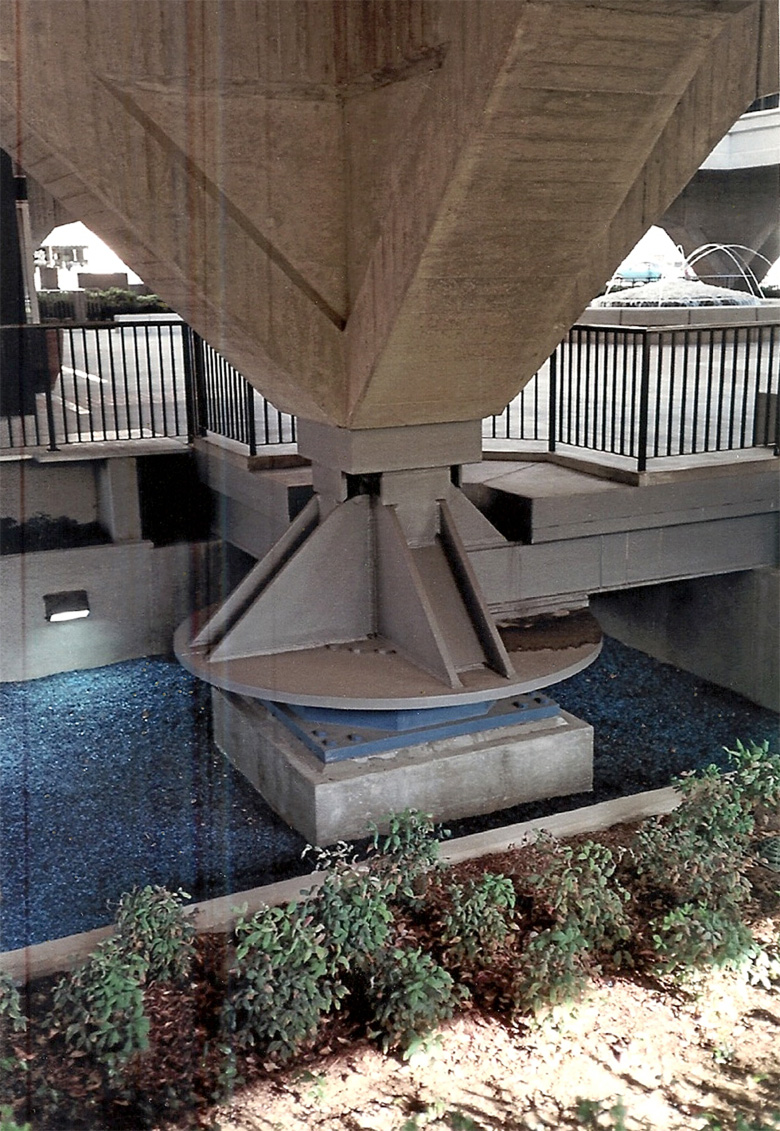
Close-up of abutment of seismically retrofitted Municipal Services Building in Glendale, California

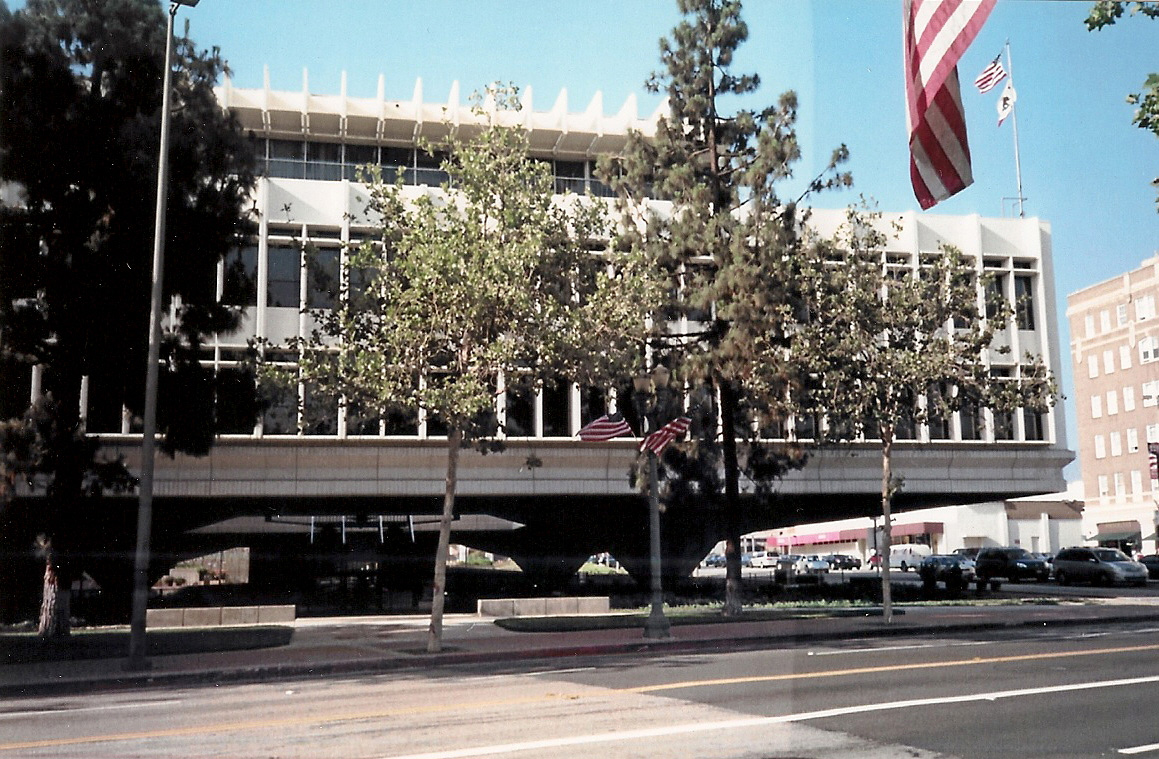
Seismically retrofitted Municipal Services Building in Glendale

Designed by architect Merrill W. Baird of Glendale, working in collaboration with A. C. Martin Architects of Los Angeles, the Municipal Services Building at 633 East Broadway, Glendale was completed in 1966. Prominently sited at the corner of East Broadway and Glendale Avenue, this civic building serves as a heraldic element of Glendale's civic center.

In October 2004 Architectural Resources Group (ARG) was contracted by Nabih Youssef & Associates, Structural Engineers, to provide services regarding a historic resource assessment of the building due to a proposed seismic retrofit.

In 2008, the Municipal Services Building of the City of Glendale, California was seismically retrofitted using an innovative combined vibration control solution: the existing elevated building foundation of the building was put on high damping rubber bearings.

=== Steel plate walls system ===
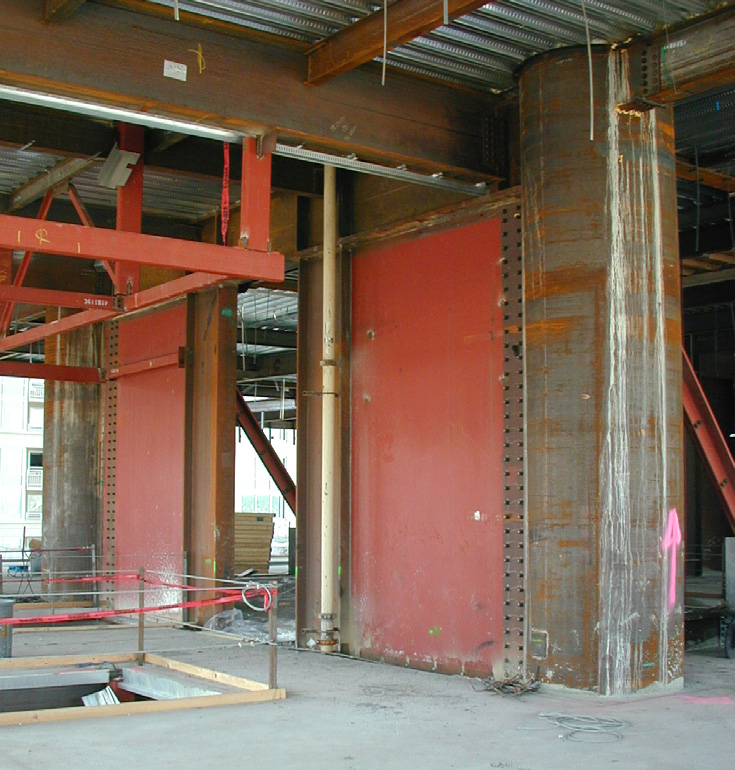
Coupled steel plate shear walls, Seattle

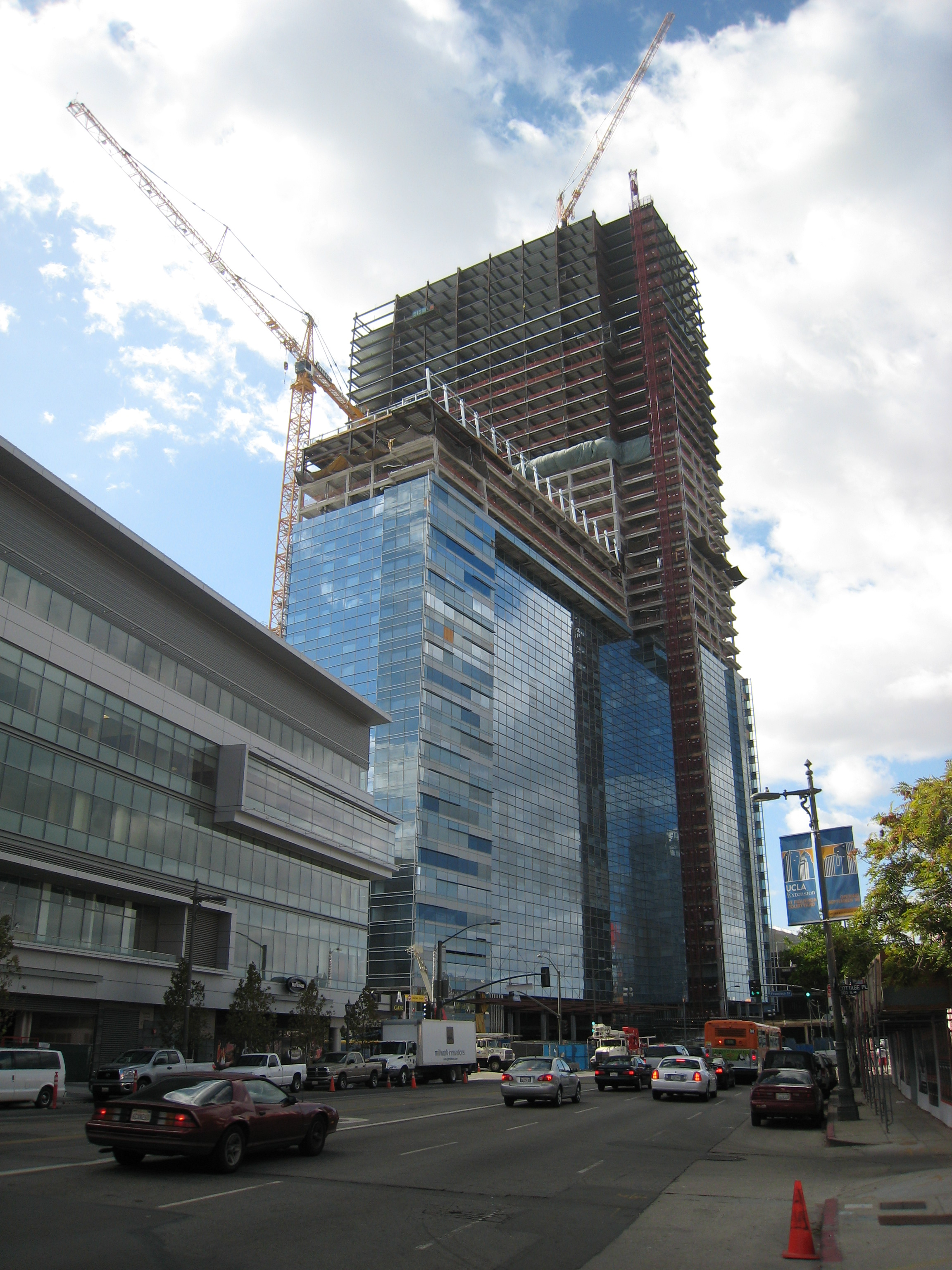
The Ritz-Carlton/JW Marriott hotel building engaging the advanced steel plate shear walls system, Los Angeles

A steel plate shear wall (SPSW) consists of steel infill plates bounded by a column-beam system. When such infill plates occupy each level within a framed bay of a structure, they constitute a SPSW system. Whereas most earthquake resistant construction methods are adapted from older systems, SPSW was invented entirely to withstand seismic activity.

SPSW behavior is analogous to a vertical plate girder cantilevered from its base. Similar to plate girders, the SPSW system optimizes component performance by taking advantage of the post-buckling behavior of the steel infill panels.

The Ritz-Carlton/JW Marriott hotel building, a part of the LA Live development in Los Angeles, California, is the first building in Los Angeles that uses an advanced steel plate shear wall system to resist the lateral loads of strong earthquakes and winds.

=== Kashiwazaki–Kariwa Nuclear Power Plant upgrade ===
The Kashiwazaki–Kariwa Nuclear Power Plant, the largest nuclear generating station in the world by net electrical power rating, happened to be near the epicenter of the strongest M_{w} 6.6 July 2007 Chūetsu offshore earthquake. This initiated an extended shutdown for structural inspection which indicated that a greater earthquake-proofing was needed before operation could be resumed.

On May 9, 2009, one unit (Unit 7) was restarted, after the seismic upgrades. The test run had to continue for 50 days. The plant had been completely shut down for almost 22 months following the earthquake.

=== Seismic test of seven-story building ===
A destructive earthquake struck a lone, wooden condominium in Japan. The experiment was webcast live on July 14, 2009, to yield insight on how to make wooden structures stronger and better able to withstand major earthquakes.

The Miki shake at the Hyogo Earthquake Engineering Research Center is the capstone experiment of the four-year NEESWood project, which receives its primary support from the U.S. National Science Foundation Network for Earthquake Engineering Simulation (NEES) Program.

"NEESWood aims to develop a new seismic design philosophy that will provide the necessary mechanisms to safely increase the height of wood-frame structures in active seismic zones of the United States, as well as mitigate earthquake damage to low-rise wood-frame structures," said Rosowsky, Department of Civil Engineering at Texas A&M University. This philosophy is based on the application of seismic damping systems for wooden buildings. The systems, which can be installed inside the walls of most wooden buildings, include strong metal frame, bracing and dampers filled with viscous fluid.

=== Superframe earthquake proof structure ===
The proposed system is composed of core walls, hat beams incorporated into the top-level, outer columns, and viscous dampers vertically installed between the tips of the hat beams and the outer columns. During an earthquake, the hat beams and outer columns act as outriggers and reduce the overturning moment in the core, and the installed dampers also reduce the moment and the lateral deflection of the structure. This innovative system can eliminate inner beams and inner columns on each floor, and thereby provide buildings with column-free floor space even in highly seismic regions.

=== Earthquake architecture ===
The term 'seismic architecture' or 'earthquake architecture' was first introduced in 1985 by Robert Reitherman. The phrase "earthquake architecture" is used to describe a degree of architectural expression of earthquake resistance or implication of architectural configuration, form or style in earthquake resistance. It is also used to describe buildings in which seismic design considerations impacted its architecture. It may be considered a new aesthetic approach in designing structures in seismic prone areas.

== History ==
An article in Scientific American from May 1884, "Buildings that Resist Earthquakes" described early engineering efforts such as Shōsōin.

Before building codes were improved, door frames were regarded as the most reinforced element of buildings and the safest place to be under during an earthquake. This is no longer general advice, despite a common misconception to the contrary.

== See also ==
- Earthquake Baroque – Baroque architecture intended to resist earthquakes
- Emergency management – Dealing with all humanitarian aspects of emergencies
- Geotechnical engineering – Scientific study of earth materials in engineering problems
- Seismic response of landfill – Relationship between landfills and seismic activity
- Seismic retrofit – Modification of existing structures to make them more resistant to seismic activity
- Tsunami-proof building – Building designed to withstand extreme floods
