= Bolo de fubá =

Brazilian maize flour cake

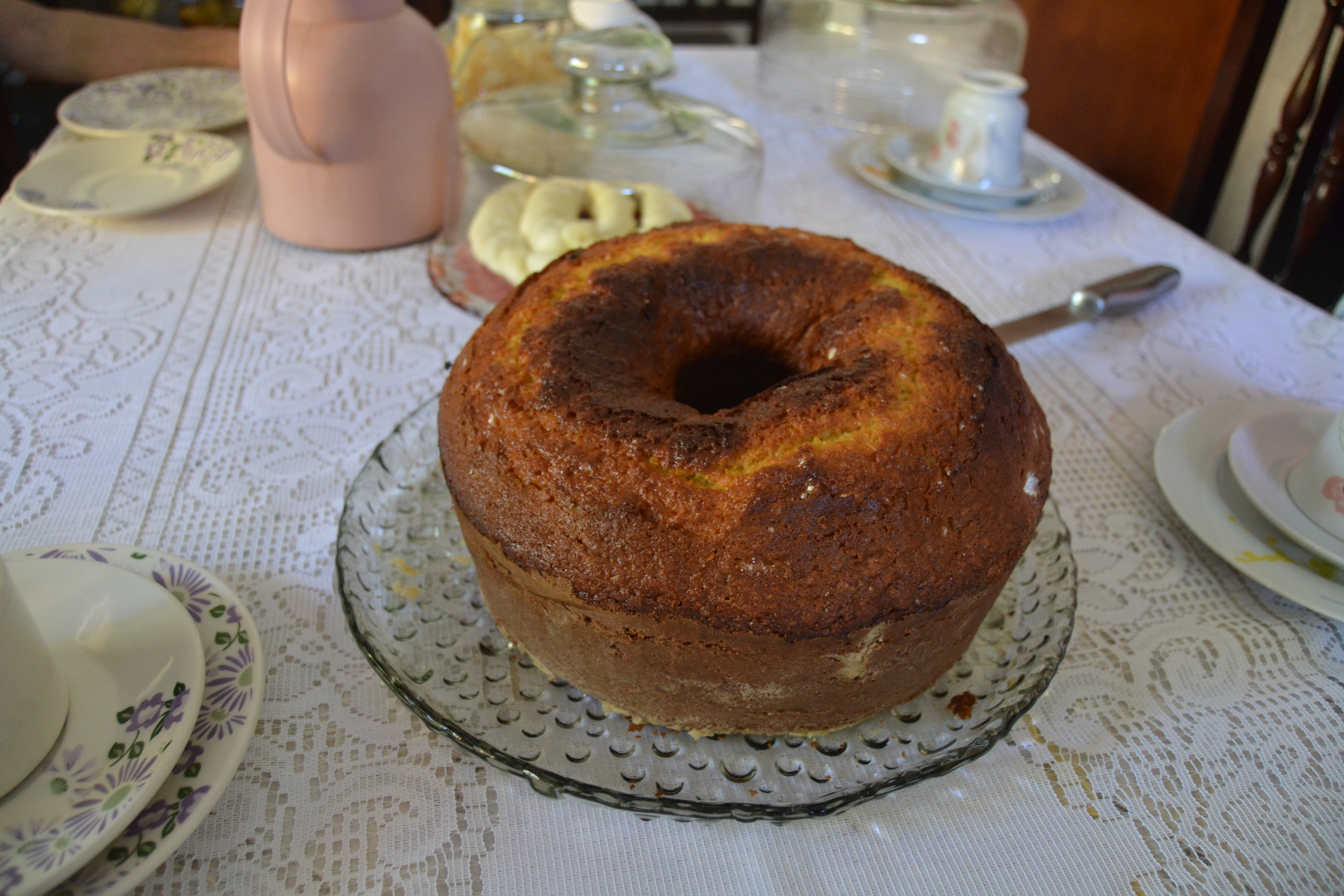
- Type: Cake
- Place of origin: Brazil
- Associated cuisine: Brazilian cuisine
- Similar dishes: Cobu

Bolo de fubá is a traditional Brazilian cake made with fubá de milho (finely ground maize flour). The cake is associated with rural Brazil and is often eaten in the afternoon alongside coffee or tea. It is also common at Festa Juninas as the festivities coincide with the harvest of corn in Brazil. The simplicity and prevalence of the cake throughout the country has led to several small variations to the basic recipe to include ingredients such as coconut milk, anise, goiabada, and cheese.

== Etymology ==
Fubá is a Brazilian Portuguese word that designates flour generally, whether it be rice, cassava, or maize flour. The word was borrowed from the Kimbundu word for flour, which was used by enslaved Africans in Brazil to refer to dry milled corn.

According to the Brazilian Health Regulatory Agency, fubá and cornmeal (farinha de milho) are synonyms and both refer to milled and sifted corn. Despite this official definition, in colloquial Brazilian Portuguese, fubá generally refers to very finely ground cornmeal that is used for baking, whereas farinha de milho has larger grains and is used for cooking.

== See also ==
- Cobu, bolo de fubá cooked in a banana leaf
- Broa
