= Superstructure =

Upward extension of an existing structure or ship

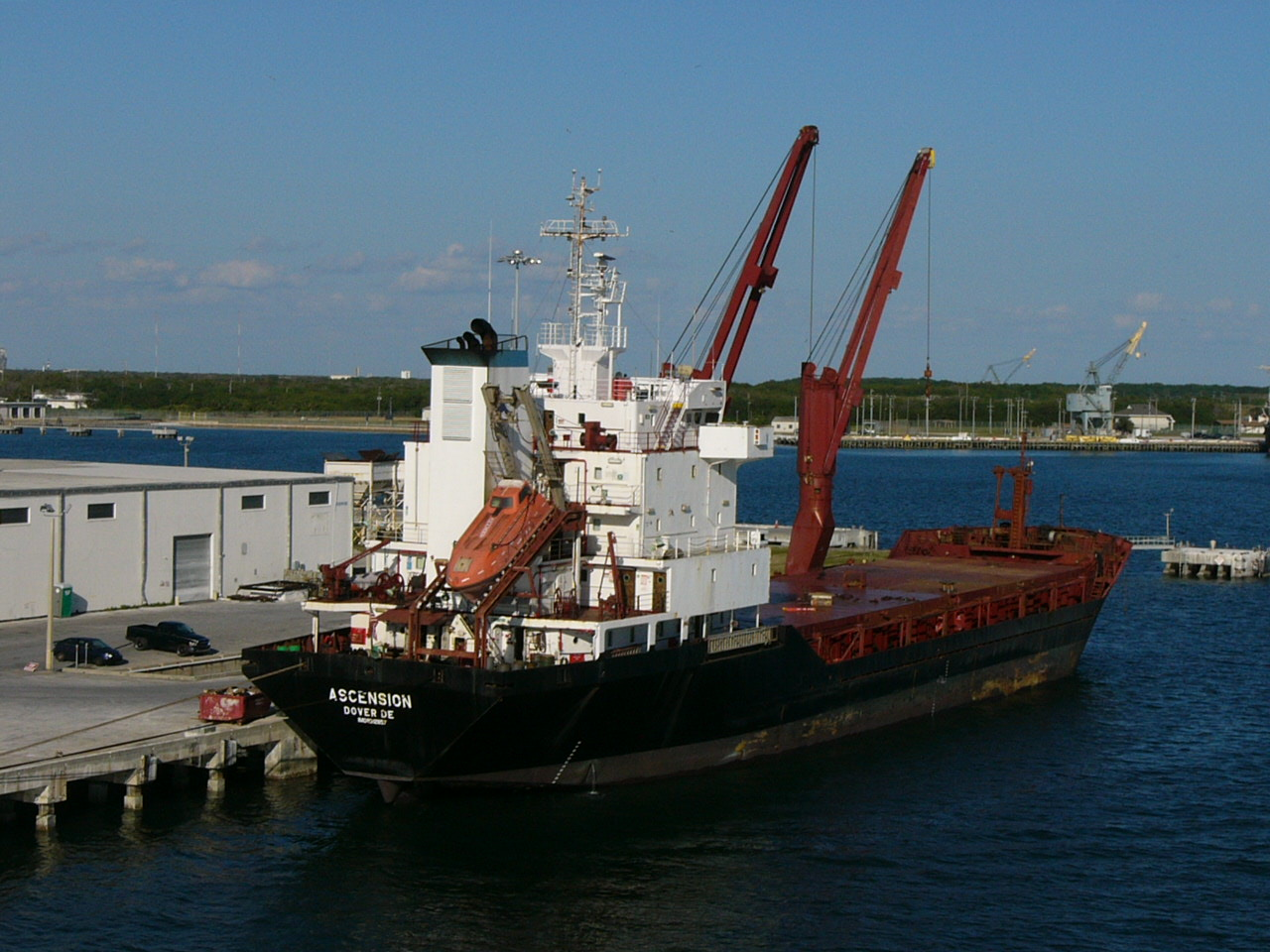
The superstructure of this cargo ship is at the back and includes a lifeboat.

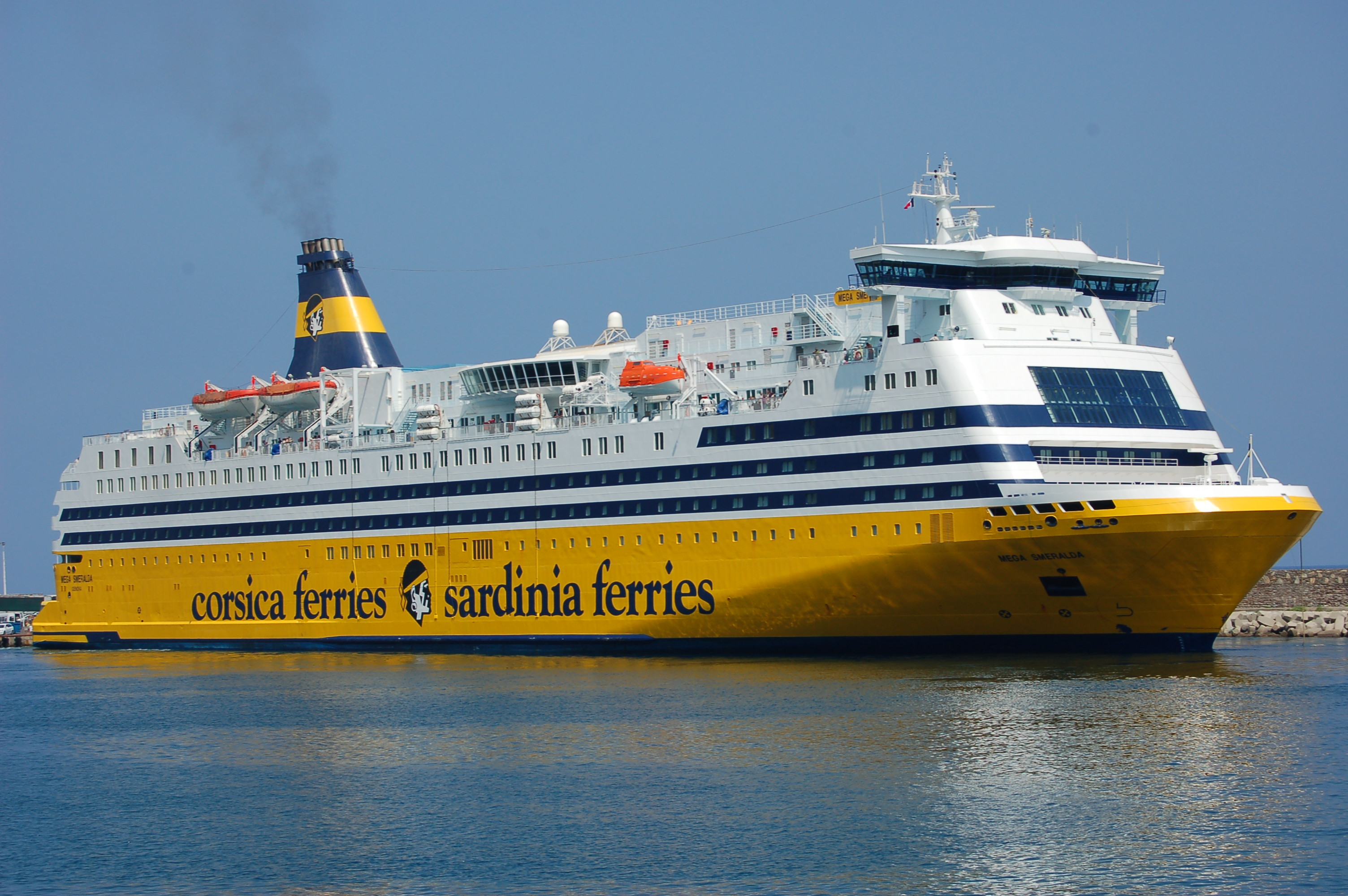
The cruiseferry Mega Smeralda. The blue and white part of the ship is the superstructure and the yellow part of the ship is the hull.

Superstructure is an upward extension of an existing structure above a baseline. This term is applied to various kinds of physical structures such as buildings, bridges, or ships.

== Aboard ships and large boats ==
On water craft, the superstructure consists of the parts of the ship or a boat, including sailboats, fishing boats, passenger ships, and submarines, that project above her main deck. This does not usually include its masts or any armament turrets. Note that, in modern times, turrets do not always carry naval artillery. They can also carry missile launchers or antisubmarine warfare weapons.

The size of a watercraft's superstructure can have many implications in the performance of ships and boats, since these structures can alter their structural rigidity, their displacements, and/or stability. These can be detrimental to any vessel's performance if they are taken into consideration incorrectly.

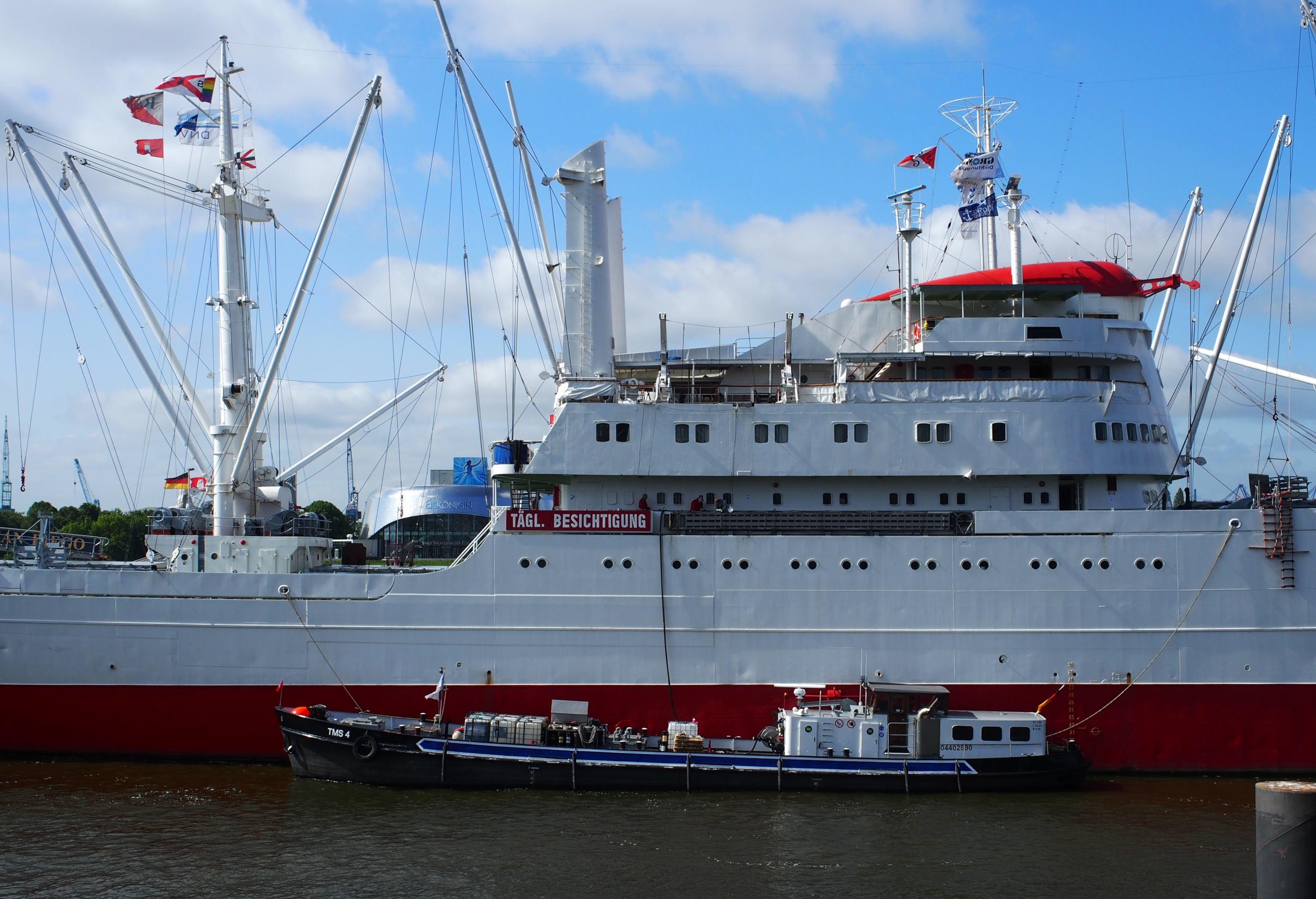
Superstructure of the freight ship Cap San Diego

The height and the weight of superstructure on board a ship or a boat also affects the amount of freeboard that such a vessel requires along her sides, down to her waterline. In broad terms, the more and heavier superstructure that a ship possesses (as a fraction of her length), the less the freeboard that is needed.

== Bridges ==
The span of a bridge, the portion that directly receives the live load, is referred to as the superstructure. In contrast, the abutment, piers, and other support structures are the substructure.

== Earthquake protection ==
In order to improve the response during earthquakes of buildings and bridges, the superstructure may be separated from its foundation by various civil engineering mechanisms or machinery. All together, these implement the system of earthquake protection called base isolation.
