= Spatial configuration =

In landscape ecology, spatial configuration describes the spatial pattern of patches in a landscape. Most traditional spatial configuration measurements take into account aspects of patches within the landscape, including patches' size, shape, density, connectivity and fractal dimension. Other measurements are pixel-based, such as contagion and lacunarity. Together with spatial composition, spatial configuration is a basic component of landscape heterogeneity indices.

== See also ==
- Patch dynamics
