= Substructure (engineering) =

The substructure of a building transfers the load of the building, bridge, or other structure to the ground and isolates it horizontally from the ground. This includes foundations and basement retaining walls. It is differentiated from the superstructure. It safeguards the building against the forces of wind, uplift, soil pressure etc. It provides a level and firm surface for the construction of superstructure. It also prevents unequal or differential settlement and ensures stability of the building against sliding, overturning, undermine due to floodwater or burrowing animals.
