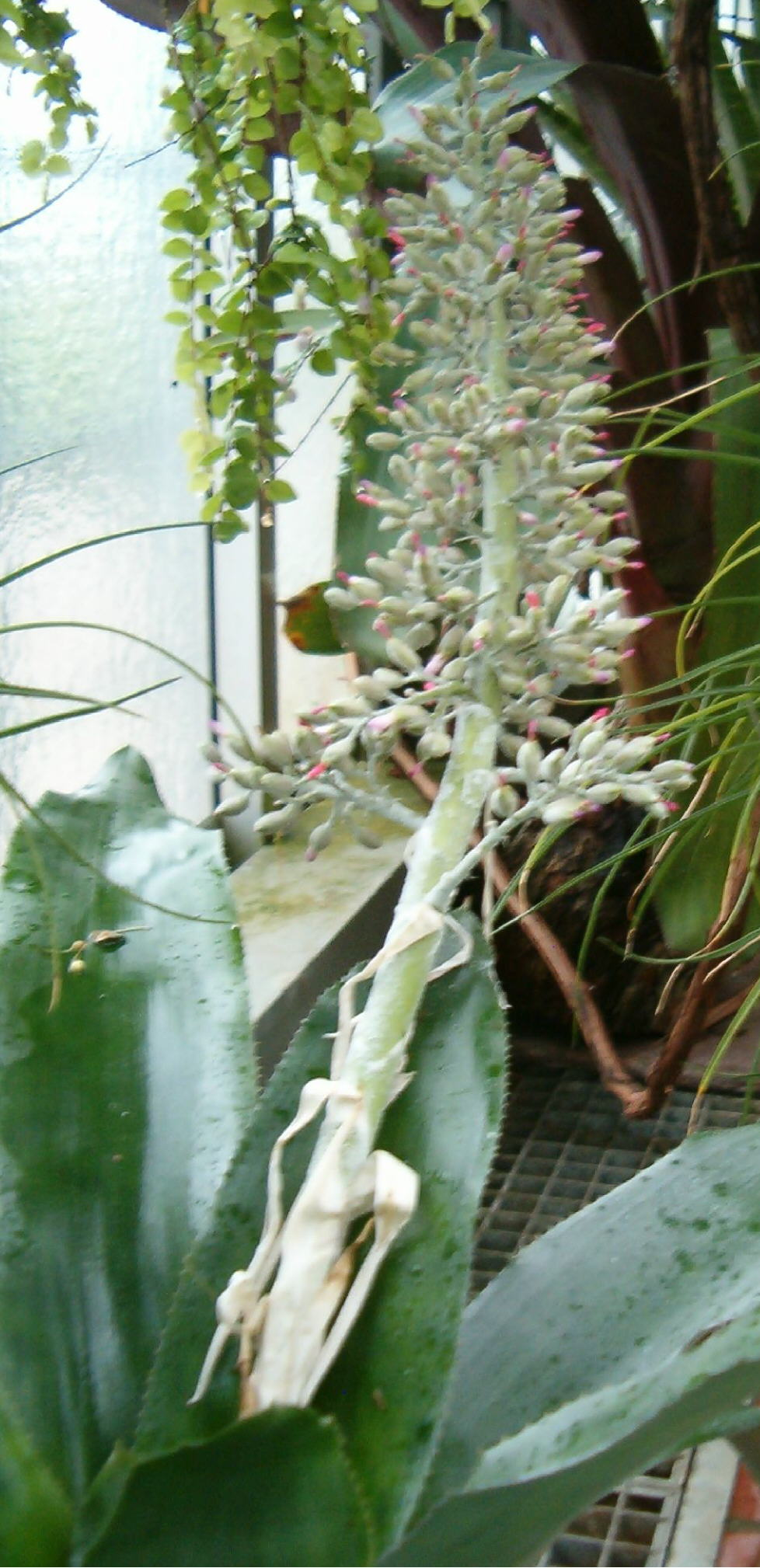
- Aechmea mexicana inflorescence at the Berlin-Dahlem Botanical Garden and Botanical Museum

Scientific classification
- Kingdom: Plantae
- Clade: Tracheophytes
- Clade: Angiosperms
- Clade: Monocots
- Clade: Commelinids
- Order: Poales
- Family: Bromeliaceae
- Genus: Aechmea
- Subgenus: Aechmea subg. Podaechmea; Mez

Type species
- Aechmea lueddmanniana

Species
- See text

= Aechmea subg. Podaechmea =

Subgenus of flowering plants

Podaechmea is a subgenus of the genus Aechmea.

== Species ==
Species accepted by Encyclopedia of Bromeliads as of October 2022:

Image	Scientific name	Distribution
	Aechmea aenigmatica Lopez-Ferrari, Espejo, Ceja & A.Mendoza	Mexico (Oaxaca)
	Aechmea baudoensis Aguirre-Santoro & Betancur	Colombia
	Aechmea ferruginea L.B.Sm.	Peru.
	Aechmea haltonii H.Luther	Panama.
	Aechmea lueddemanniana (K.Koch) Mez	Costa Rica, Guatemala, Belize, Honduras, Nicaragua and southern Mexico
	Aechmea mexicana Baker	southern Mexico, Central America, Colombia and Ecuador.
