= Motion ratio =

Engineering ratio

The motion ratio of a mechanism is the ratio of the displacement of the point of interest to that of another point.

The most common example is in a vehicle's suspension, where it is used to describe the displacement and forces in the springs and shock absorbers. The force in the spring is (roughly) the vertical force at the contact patch divided by the motion ratio, and the spring rate is the wheel rate divided by the motion ratio squared.

$IR = \frac{Spring Displacement}{Wheel Displacement}.$
$$MR = \frac{Wheel Displacement}{Spring Displacement}.$$
$Wheel rate = {Spring rate}*{IR^2}.$
$$Wheel rate = {Spring rate}/{MR^2}.$$

This is described as the Installation Ratio in the reference. Motion ratio is the more common term in the industry, but sometimes is used to mean the inverse of the above definition.

Motion ratio in suspension of a vehicle describes the amount of shock travel for a given amount of wheel travel. Mathematically, it is the ratio of shock travel and wheel travel. The amount of force transmitted to the vehicle chassis reduces with increase in motion ratio. A motion ratio close to one is desired in the vehicle for better ride and comfort. One should know the desired wheel travel of the vehicle before calculating motion ratio, which depends much on the type of track the vehicle will run upon.

Selecting the appropriate ratio depends on multiple factors:

1. Bending moment: To reduce the bending moment the strut point should be close to the wheel.
2. Suspension stiffness: Suspensions tends to stiffen when the inclination of the shock absorber to horizontal tends to 90 degrees.
3. Half-shafts: In suspensions of driven wheels, wheel travel is in many cases constrained by the universal joints of the half shafts. Design the motion ratio such that at maximum bounce and rebound shocks are the first components that bottom out by hitting bump stops.
