= Berlin Botanical Garden and Botanical Museum =

Botanical garden and museum in Berlin, Germany

- Botanischer Garten und Botanisches Museum Berlin
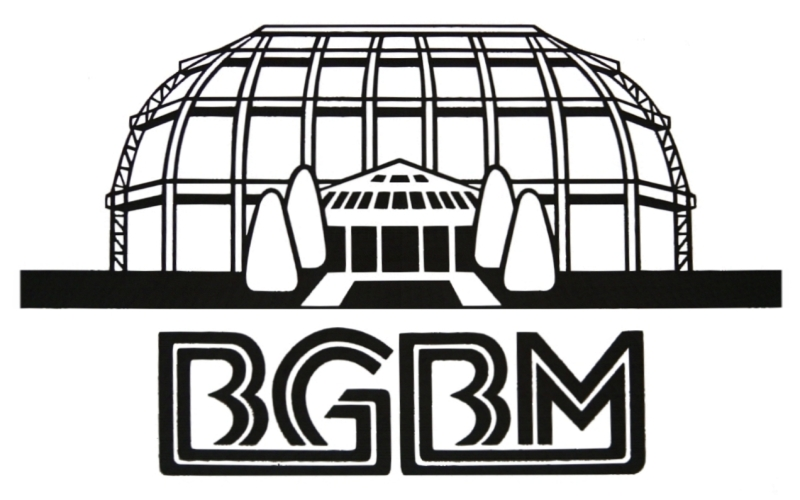
- Logo of the BGBM

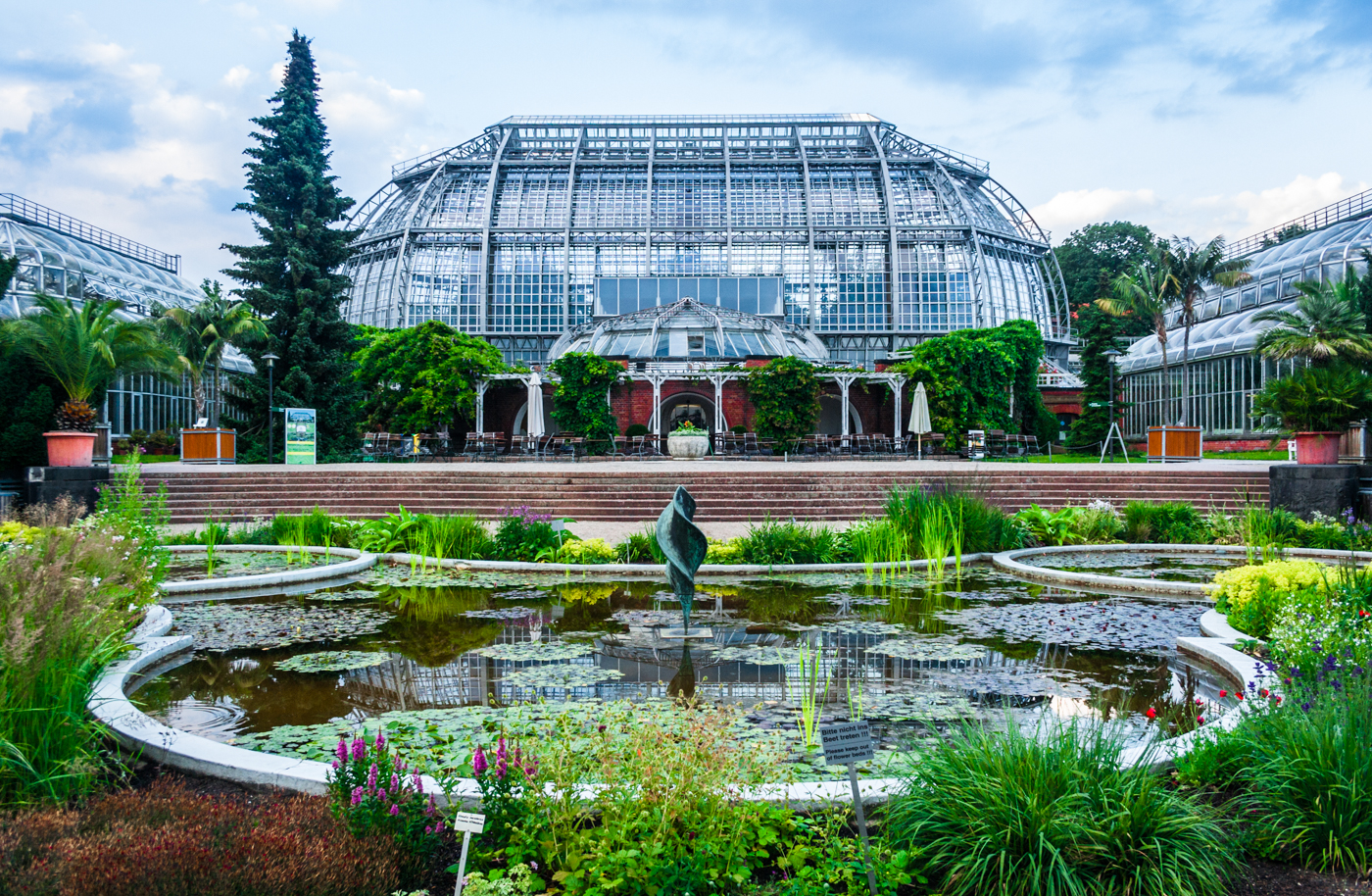
- Coordinates: 52°27′18″N 13°18′13″E
- Founder: Adolf Engler
- CEO: Thomas Borsch (2008–present)
- Website: bo.berlin

The Berlin Botanic Garden and Botanical Museum (German: Botanischer Garten und Botanisches Museum Berlin) is a botanical garden in the Lichterfelde locality of the borough of Steglitz-Zehlendorf, Berlin, Germany. Constructed between 1897 and 1910 under the guidance of architect Adolf Engler, it has an area of 42 hectares [ha] (104 acres) and over 20,000 different plant species. The garden is part of the Free University of Berlin and attracts about half a million visitors annually.

Historically, the garden was commonly referred to as the Dahlem Botanical Garden, a name derived from the Royal Domain of Dahlem, where it was established in the late 1890s. However, since the latter part of the 20th century, the area has been included in the Lichterfelde West neighbourhood in the Berlin-Lichterfelde district.

The most well-known part of the garden is the Great Pavilion of Great Tropical Greenhouse (Großes Tropenhaus), and among its many tropical plants, it hosts giant bamboo. The garden complex consists of several buildings, including glass-houses with a total area of 6,000 square metres [m^{2}] (64,583 sq ft). These include the glass Cactus Pavilion and the glass Pavilion Victoria; the latter features a collection of orchids, carnivorous plants and the giant white water lily Victoria amazonica (Victoria-Seerosen). The open-air areas are sorted by geographical origin and encompass about 13 ha (32 acres). The arboretum is about 14 ha (35 acres).

The Botanical Museum (Botanisches Museum), the Herbarium Berolinense (B) and a large scientific library are attached to the garden. The Herbarium Berolinense is the largest in Germany and holds more than 3.5 million preserved specimens.

== Description ==
The Berlin Botanic Garden and Botanical Museum is a botanical garden in the German capital city of Berlin, with an area of 43 hectares [ha] (106 acres) and around 22,000 different plant species. It was constructed between 1897 and 1910 under the guidance of architect Adolf Engler in order to present exotic plants returned from German colonies. It is named the second largest botanic garden in the world, surpassed only by Kew Gardens in London.

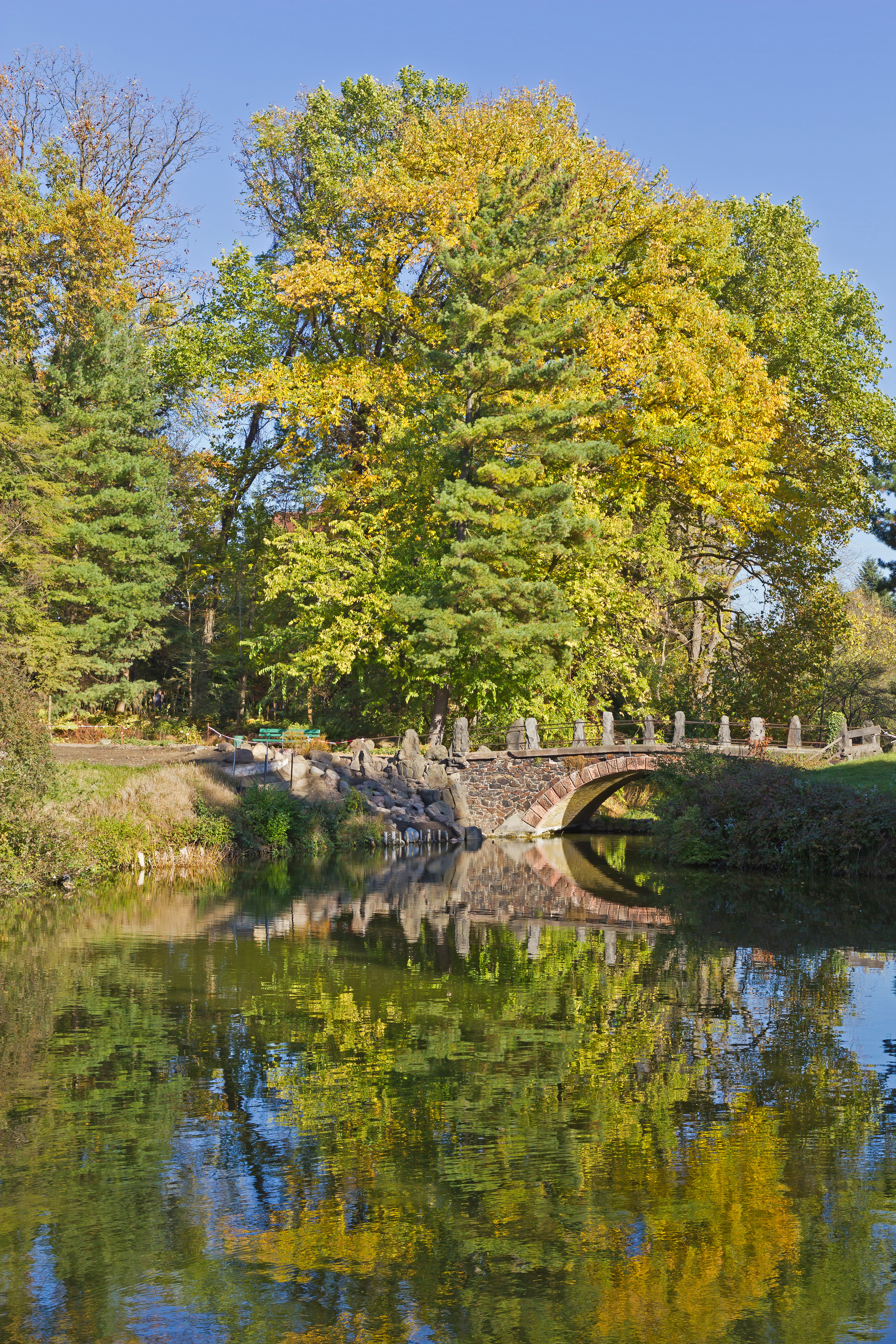
Footbridge over a pond in the Berlin Botanic Garden

The garden is located in the Lichterfelde locality of the borough of Steglitz-Zehlendorf. When it was founded, a part of it was located in Dahlem, a fact reflected in its name. Today, the garden is part of the Free University of Berlin. The Botanical Museum (Botanisches Museum), together with the Herbarium Berolinense (B) and a large scientific library, is attached to the garden. The Herbarium Berolinense is the largest herbarium in Germany and holds more than 3.5 million preserved specimens.

The complex consists of several buildings and glass-houses, such as the Cactus Pavilion and the Pavilion Victoria, which features a collection of orchids, carnivorous plants and the giant white water lily Victoria amazonica (Victoria-Seerosen). The glass-houses encompass an area of 6,000 square metres [m^{2}] (64,583 sq ft). The garden's open-air areas consist of 13 ha (32 acres) sorted by geographical origin, and the arboretum area totals 14 ha (35 acres).

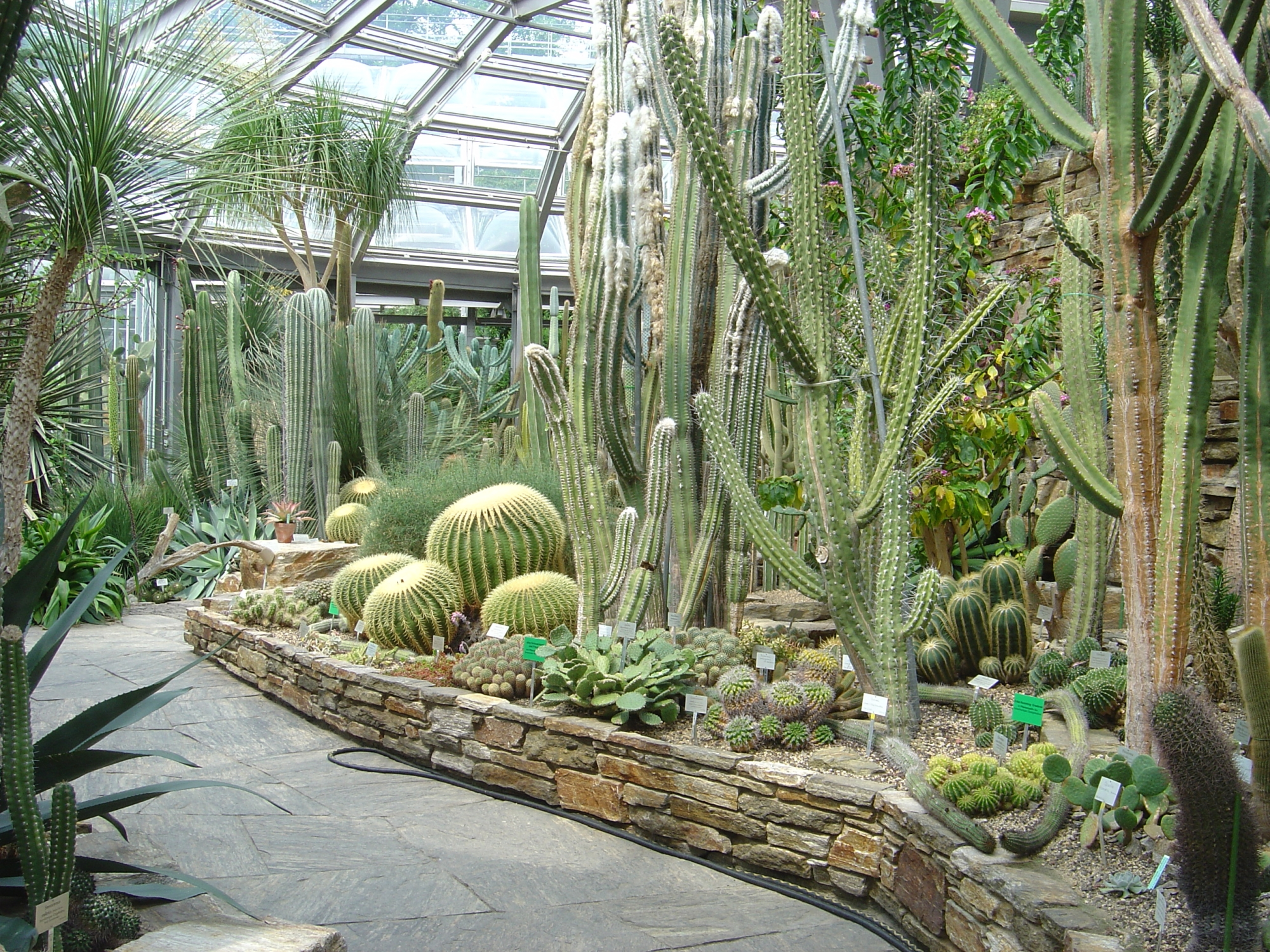
Cactus Pavilion

The best-known part of the garden is the Great Pavilion (Großes Tropenhaus). The temperature inside is maintained at 30 °C (86 °F) and air humidity is kept high. Among the many tropical plants it hosts giant bamboo.

== History ==
=== Origins ===
In the year 1573, during the time of Elector John George, the first noteworthy collection of plants for the enlargement of the national collection was achieved under the leadership of the chief gardener at the kitchen garden of the Berlin City Palace, Desiderius Corbianus. Even though the expression "botanic garden" did not exist at the time, it was, in fact, the first of its kind in Berlin. This garden later developed into the Pleasure Garden that still exists today.

In 1679 on Potsdam Street (de: Potsdamer Straße) in Schöneberg - on the site of today's Kleistpark, a hops garden was laid out. It was used for the electoral brewery and as an orchard, fruit and kitchen garden. Carl Ludwig Willdenow made sure that the garden was assigned in 1809 to the Berlin Frederick William University. Under the care of the university, the garden developed into a botanic garden with scientific character that is recognised worldwide.

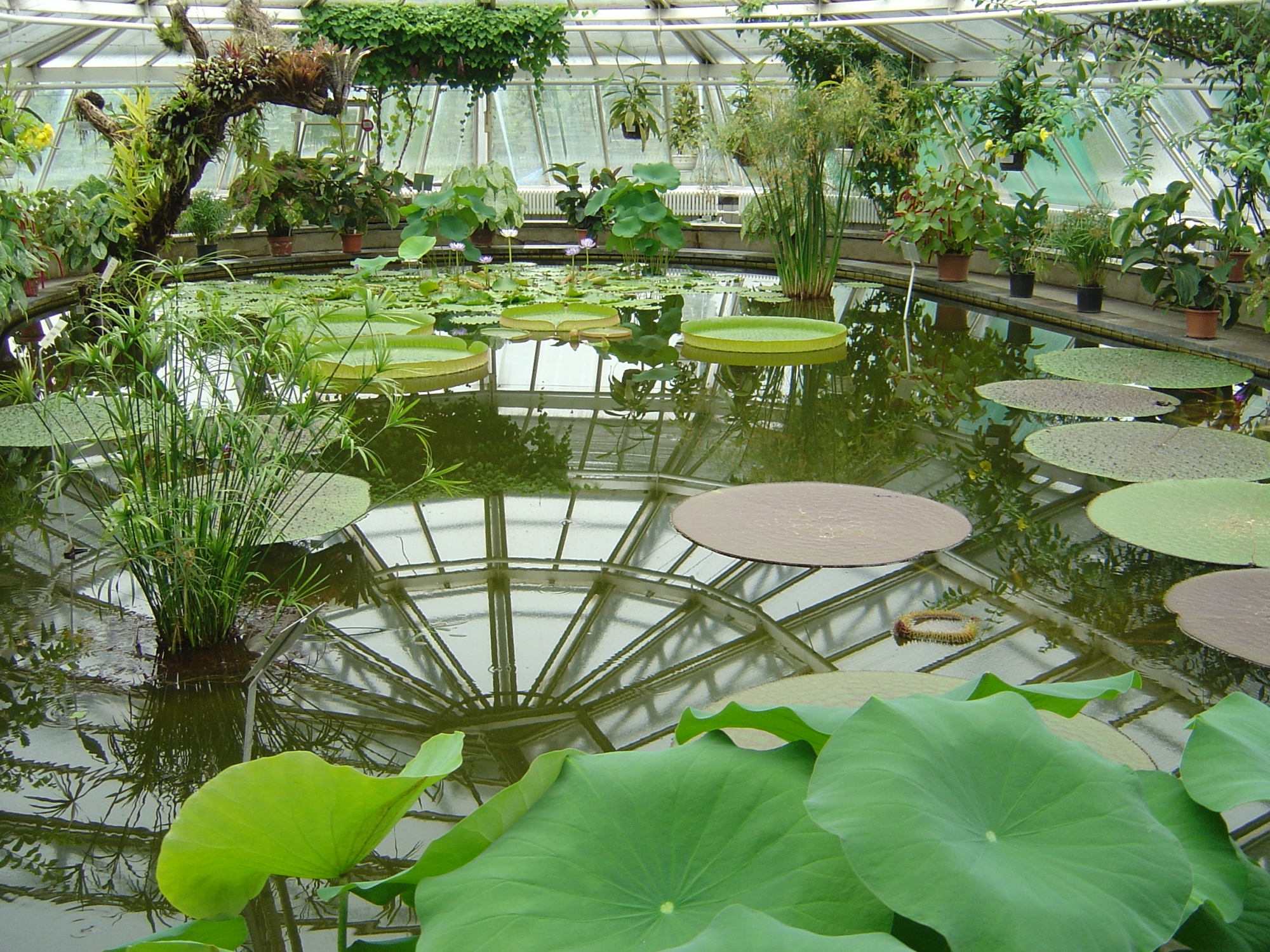
Pavilion Victoria showing the giant white water lily Victoria amazonica (Victoria-Seerosen)

The area extending south to today's Grunewaldstraße became a suburb of Berlin during the city's expansuion in 1861, known as Schöneberger Vorstadt. Following a redrawing of district boundaries in 1938, the region south of Kurfürstenstraße was reintegrated into the district of Schöneberg.

=== Relocation ===
Stimulus to move the garden was first proposed in 1888 due to several factors. The existing garden required expansion to accommodate new plantings and the creation of an arboretum. Additionally, significant renovations were needed for several aging greenhouses. Environmental conditions also played a role, as the surrounding areas of Berlin and Schöneberg had become densely developed, leading to unfavourable urban and impacts including air pollution and a lowered groundwater table, which posed harm to the plants. Financial considerations further supported the move, as selling the original site could help fund other university projects, including expansions for the Charité, the Institute for Infectious Diseases, the Institute of Hygiene, and the Institute of Pharmaceutical Chemistry.

At the time, the garden was managed by the Ministry of Spiritual, Educations, and Medical Affairs. Friedrich Althoff, representing the ministry, tasked Ignaz Urban, the interim director of the Botanical Garden, with evaluating potential relocation sites on the outskirts of Berlin. Urban identified a 41-hectare area on the Royal Domain of Dahlem, previously used as a potato field, as the most suitable location for the new botanical garden.

When the garden was established at the end of the 19th century, only about a quarter of its area was within the Dahlem district. The majority of the land belonged to the Groß-Lichterfelde district and, for postal purposes, was designated as part of the rural municipality of Steglitz, adding to administrative confusion.

The relocation and development of the new garden were significantly influenced by Friedrich Althoff, who secured the appointment of Adolf Engler, a prominent botanist, as director of the Botanical Garden in 1889. Engler, alongside architect Alfred Koerner, developed a detailed plan for the new site in 1895. Ignaz Urban, previously the interim director, was appointed sub-director in recognition of his qualifications and contribution.

On 26 June 1897, the Prussian Parliament approved the project, and site preparation began the same year. Following Emperor Wilhelm II's approval of the plans on 30 August 1899, construction commenced on the garden's enclosure and buildings. Engler oversaw the botanical aspects, while Koerner directed the architectural design. In the same year, the Botanical Centre for the German Colonies was established as a distinct department within the Botanical Garden, reflecting Germany's colonial ambitions and its integration into the garden's scientific mission.

The garden was designed with two equal entrances: one at Königin-Luise-Platz and the other on Unter den Eichen (then known as Berliner Straße). These entrances are connected by a main path, 8 to 10 meters wide. Most of the buildings, including the plant exhibition houses, are located northeast of this path, while the outdoor areas stretch to the southwest.

The garden welcomed its first visitors on 13 April 1903, opening briefly to around 2,500 guests. By 1904, the outdoor grounds were completed and officially opened to the public, a milestone later commemorated during the garden's centenary celebrations in June 2004. However, the full completion of all buildings, including the museum, was achieved only by May 24–25, 1910, marking the official opening of the garden and museum.

=== National Socialism and Reconstruction ===
The period of National Socialism brought significant setbacks for the Botanical Garden and Museum. International scientific collaboration and exchanges, vital for research, were severely restricted. Inflation and a lack of coal following the First World War resulted in the decision not to heat the greenhouses. The reduction in and reallocation of employees additionally resulted in the grounds being neglected. Later, the impacts of World War II reached Berlin, leaving extensive damage to the site.

In the lead-up to the Second World War, pressure from the Nazi Party resulted in the dismissal of Jewish employees from the Berlin Botanical Garden. The onset of the war in the winter of 1939–1940 led to the abandonment of large sections of the garden due to limited resources. By 1943, the garden had become a waiting area for Berliners seeking shelter from Allied bombing raids in a nearby underground bunker. In March 1943, an Anglo-American air raid caused a fire that nearly destroyed the herbarium and library. By the autumn of the same year, bomb blasts shattered the glazing of the greenhouses, leaving the plants exposed to the elements and destroying two rare Coco de Mer palms. It was not until December 1943 that the remnants of the herbarium and museum holdings were finally evacuated.

As Soviet forces entered Berlin, intense fighting in 1945 caused further destruction. An anti-aircraft battery positioned in front of the greenhouses became a target for artillery fire, leading to widespread damage across the garden. By the end of the war, the garden was left in ruins.

After World War II, the Botanical Garden came under the administration of the city government, as directed by the Allied authorities. The garden reopened to the public in the autumn of 1945. Between 1947 and 1949, parts of the garden were temporarily repurposed to grow potatoes and vegetable cultivation, using Shire horses to plough the land, in response to severe food shortages among the local population. Reconstruction efforts were significantly hampered by Berlin's division into Allied sectors following the war. Despite these challenges, reconstruction of the garden began in 1949 with financial support from the United States. By early 1958, the entire glasshouse complex—except for the Tropical House—had been rebuilt.

=== Post-War Period ===
The Victoriahaus was the first major greenhouse to be restored and reopened in 1950, marking the initial phase of recovery. By 1968, the garden's reconstruction was completed with the opening of the large tropical greenhouse. Efforts to rebuild the adjacent Botanical Museum began in 1959, under the scientific and organisational leadership of botanist Eva Potztal, who later became the museum's director. The museum's reconstruction was not completed until 1987. Although structural damage was repaired over the course of four decades, the loss of unique botanical materials from the war remains irreplaceable. In August 1961, the construction of the Berlin Wall had a significant impact on the Botanical garden again. Many employees who lived in East Berlin were suddenly unavailable to travel to work, leaving the garden understaffed and further complicating its post-war recovery and maintenance efforts.

In 1996, the Botanical Garden and Museum were incorporated into the Freie Universität Berlin, gaining the status of a faculty-independent central institution.

In 2003, the garden faced a significant threat of closure dur to extensive funding cuts proposed by the Berlin Senate. Public support for the garden was overwhelming, with 78,000 signatures collected within a few months to advocate for its preservation. On 7 July 2003, the director of the garden presented these signatures to the President of the Berlin Parliament.

Although the garden was ultimately saved from closure, it was required to implement budget reductions, with its funding reduced by one million euros to 6.8 million euros between 2004 and 2009. Additionally, 20 gardener positions were eliminated during this period.

=== Further Renovations and Upgrades ===
In the summer of 2021, the Berlin Senate approved plans to renovate and upgrade the Botanical Garden and Museum with a focus on accessibility, infrastructure improvement, and enhanced educational initiatives. The project, scheduled for completion in 2023, involved an investment of approximately 17 million euros for the garden and an additional 9 million euros for the museum.

The renovation aims to make the facilities more accessible to tourists while promoting dialogue on species conservation and biodiversity through exhibitions and guided tours. The renovations also address the institution's commitment toward improvements to climate and biodiversity crises as collective societal challenges, and gives particular focus to fostering understanding of food plants and the connections between the environment, climate, and plant life.

The museum's remodeling, under the motto "More garden, more museum, more knowledge," includes plans to fully digitise its plant collections, research data, and seed bank by 2030, making them globally accessible.

== Directors ==
Directors of the ‘new’ botanical garden:

- 1889 to 1921: Adolf Engler
- 1921 to 1945: Ludwig Diels
- 1945 to 1950: Robert Knud Friedrich Pilger
- 1950 to 1951: Johannes Mattfeld (acting)
- 1951 to 1958: Erich Werdermann (acting until 1955)
- 1958 to 1959: Hans Melchior (acting)
- 1959 to 1961: Theo Eckardt (acting)
- 1961 to 1964: Walter Domke
- 1964 to 1976: Theo Eckardt
- 1976 to 1978: Johannes Gerloff (acting)
- 1978 to 2008: Werner Greuter (acting since 2004)
- since 2008: Thomas Borsch

== Grounds and plants ==
=== Layout ===
Adolf Engler designed the grounds of the gardens as a landscaped garden. The largest sections are the 12.9 ha (31.9 acres) geographical gardens and the 13.9 ha (34.3 acres) arboretum. The geographical gardens, situated west of the main path, encircle the Italian garden (de: Italienischer Garten), which lies just opposite the exhibition green houses. These areas were intended to display plants from various continents and habitats in conditions as close to their natural surroundings as possible. To accommodate this, the structure and composition of the subsoil were modified extensively, requiring the movement of 136,000 cubic metres [m^{3}] (4,802,795 cu ft) of soil. The existing carp pond (Karpfenpfuhl), originally a pool of moraines that was already on the grounds before the creation of the botanical gardens, was enlarged and extended by a second basin to form an oak pond. This facilitates the showcasing of waterside riparian plants. The two basins are connected by a short ditch, which is crossed by a stone bridge.

The southern and western part of the gardens are occupied by the arboretum, a comprehensive and systematic collection of native plants. The arboretum also borders both sections of the oak pond, integrating native waterside plants as part of the collection.

In the northwestern area of the garden, a "systematic section" was also established, where plants were arranged according to their affinity or botanical relationship to one another. This section suffered extensive damage during air strikes, artillery fire and fighting on ground fighting in April and May 1945. It has since been rebuilt in a modified version and now houses a compound for the system of herbaceous plants and one for medical plants. This medicinal compound has been built in the shape of a human body with the plants arranged in the positions of their healing properties for specific areas of the body. This feature serves as the successor of the Apothecary's Garden (Apothekergarten) which was situated further to the east, along with the "Economical section" which presented useful plants. The Apothecary's Garden was especially important for showcasing medicinal plants that could thrive outdoors.

To the east of the main path, two morphological sections were situated in the open areas between the buildings. Particularly notable here, is the water and marsh bed system in Section II, which consisted of 262 cement concrete basins equipped with water sprinkling and drainage systems for overflowing water. A large water basin in this system was heated to support tropical swamp flora. While the system remains intact, it was abandoned following the installation of a nearby marsh and water plants garden. The old compound was subsequently repurposed as a biotrope and conservation area for native wild plants and animals.

In 1984, "Morphological Section I" was replaced by the "Fragrance and Touch Garden", designed to enhance accessibility for blind and visually impaired visitors. This garden features Braille labels on all plant signs and relief maps at its entrances. Additionally, Braille booklets are available for loan at the ticket offices to aid navigation.

Also located to the eat of the main path was the colonial garden, created for studying plants useful for cultivation in Germany's colonies. Nearby, close to the southern entrance, annuals and perennials, and garden flowers have been on display since the garden's opening.

A relatively recent addition is the "Elector's Garden" situated in the northern courtyard of the greenhouse complex. This garden recreates the style of a courtyard and a kitchen garden from the Berlin City Palace of the 17th century. The design is inspired by Johann Sigismund Elsholtz's Flora Marchica, published in 1663, which documented the planting practices of the period.

=== Special Plants ===
With a collection of 22,000 species, the Berlin Botanical Garden is ranked third worldwide in terms of biodiversity. Among its notable plants are:

- 160-Year-Old Palm Fern: The oldest plant in the garden, this palm fern was already part of the collection in the original Botanic Garden in Schöneberg.
- Giant Bamboo: Located in the Great Tropical House, this bamboo grows to an impressive height of 25 meters, with stems measuring 15 cm in diameter and a growth rate of up to 30 cm per day.
- Welwitschia: A rare specimen over 20 years old, it is the only Welwitschia in a botanical garden worldwide that produces seeds, making it a unique highlight of the collection.

=== Sponsorship ===
The Garden offers sponsorship opportunities to support its work financially. Individuals can sponsor plants, with annual costs ranging from 250 to 1,500 euros depending on the plant's size and rarity. Prominent sponsors and their chosen plants include:

- Wigald Boning: Bristle Fern
- Nina Ruge: Calabash Tree
- Renate Künast: Peacock Wheel Fern
- Suzanne von Borsody: Golden Globe Cactus
- Dr. Motte: Love Pearl Bush and Burning Love

Additionally, donors can sponsor a pathway in the garden for 60 euros per square meter, with the funds directed towards path renovations.

=== Art ===
Through the years, numerous pieces of art have been placed in the gardens, especially in the Italienischer Schmuckgarten (Italian Decorative Garden):

- Irma Langhinrichs: Geteilte Form (1975), erected 1988, on the main path near the entrance Königin-Luise-Platz
- Makoto Fujiwara: Brunnenplastik (1987) in the Wassergarten (water gardens)
- Irma Langhinrichs: Zellkörper (1964) in the water basin of the Italienischer Garten (Italian Garden)
- Constantin Starck: Flötenspieler und Mädchen mit Oleanderzweig (1928) in the Italienischer Garten (Italian Garden), reconstructed 1991–1992
- Arthur Lewin-Funcke: Hingebung (1916) in the Italienischer Garten (Italian Garden)
- Memorial for Christian Konrad Sprengel (1916)
- Hermann Joachim Pagels: Sämann (1920s), near the entrance Unter den Eichen
- Fritz Klimsch: Junges Mädchen, between the Systematische Abteilung (systematic section) and Arzneipflanzenabteilung (medical plants section)

== Greenhouses ==
The Botanical Garden originally featured 16 show greenhouses, 15 of which remain today, constructed on the southwestern slope of the Fichtenberg, allowing for an optimal layout and functionality. These greenhouses were designed to showcase specific plant collections in carefully controlled environments replicating their natural habitats.

=== Original greenhouse layout ===
Fourteen of the remaining 15 greenhouses form a rectangular complex dominated by the Great Tropical Greenhouse. The layout takes advantage of the slope, with larger greenhouses positioned in the second row, higher up and smaller, flatter greenhouses situated three meters lower along the main path. This arrangement maximises sunlight exposure and prevents mutual shading.

- A: The Great Tropical Greenhouse (reopened in September 2009 after extensive renovations)
- B: Begonias
- C: Tropical Useful Plants
- D: Orchids and Pitcher Plants
- E: Plants of the Humid Tropics
- F: Tropical and Subtropical Ferns
- G: Bromeliads
- H: Succulent Plants of Africa
- I: Cacti and Other Succulent Plants of the Americas
- K: South African Plants
- L: Carnivorous Plants and Plants of the Southern Hemisphere
- M: Plants from Australia and New Zealand
- N: Camellias and Azaleas
- O: Victoria House and Marsh Plant House (reopened after restoration)
- P: Mediterranean and Canary Islands Plants

Back Row:

- C: Tropical Useful Plants (393 m^{2}, 11.50 m height)
- M: Plants from Australia and New Zealand (393 m^{2}, 11.50 m height)

Connected by:

- B: Begonias (288 m^{2}, 4.50 m height)
- N: Camellias and Azaleas (288 m^{2}, 4.50 m height)

Front Row:

- E: Plants of the Humid Tropics (154 m^{2}, 9.30 m height)
- G: Bromeliads (154 m^{2}, 9.30 m height)
- H: Succulent Plants of Africa (154 m^{2}, 9.30 m height)
- K: South African Plants (154 m^{2}, 9.30 m height)

Connected by:

- F: Tropical and Subtropical Ferns (191 m^{2}, 4.50 m height)
- I: Cacti and Other Succulent Plants of the Americas (191 m^{2}, 4.50 m height)

Connecting Greenhouses:

- D: Orchids and Pitcher Plants (231 m^{2}, 3.30 m height)
- L: Carnivorous Plants and Plants of the Southern Hemisphere (231 m^{2}, 3.30 m height

=== Highlighted greenhouses ===
- A: The Great Tropical Greenhouse (reopened in 2009 after extensive renovations) dominates the complex with its advanced design and environmental controls.
- O: The Victoria House and Marsh Plant House (restored and reopened later) features specialized aquatic and marsh plant collections.
- P: The Mediterranean and Canary Islands House is located separately, showcasing plants from those regions.

A distinctive feature of these greenhouses is their innovative construction technique. Some, such as the subtropical greenhouse, have internal steel support frames, while others, like the Great Tropical Greenhouse, feature external steel frames. This design reduces heat loss, minimises condensation, and prevents dripping water on the steel beams, enhancing plant care and energy efficiency.

The total floor area of the originally heated display greenhouses was 8,192m², supplemented by unheated "earth houses" for cold frames covered approximately 1,500m². This combination of functional design and technological advancements reflected the era's progress in greenhouse construction.

==== Redevelopment (1979–1987) ====
Between 1979 and 1987, the greenhouses in the front row (E to K) were demolished and replaced with new structures designed by architect and artist Engelbert Kremser. This redevelopment was prompted by structural decay and the need for more space. Kremser utilised modern design principles, incorporating organic curves in the facades and roof transitions to evoke natural forms.

=== The Great Tropical Greenhouse ===
The Great Tropical House, completed between 1905 and 1907, remains one of the largest steel and glass structures in the world. Designed by architect Alfred Koerner and structural engineer Heinrich Müller-Breslau, it is considered Koerner's most significant work. Despite being over a century old, it continues to exemplify advanced architectural and engineering achievements of its time.

The building measures 60.04 meters in length, 29.34 meters in width, and approximately 25 meters in height, covering a floor area of 1,728m² and enclosing a volume of 36,200m³. Its central planting bed alone spans 1,000m², with an earth depth of 3.50 meters. Beneath the central bed is a cellar room containing radiators for heating, supplemented by three rings of heating pipes integrated into the glass roof. These pipes, with a small diameter, are discreetly hidded from view.

The structure features steel three-hinged arches on the exterior, while the glass façade is suspended on the interior. This design not only minimised heat loss but also optimised the building's aesthetic and structural integrity. For maintenance, three galleries encircle the interior and are accessible via the glass tower located at the rear of the building.

==== Impact of World War II ====
The steel structures of the greenhouses survived the Second World War intact. However, in the autumn of 1943, the blast waves from nearby bomb explosions shattered most of the glass panes. This devastation left the tropical plants exposed to freezing temperatures, resulting in the loss of the majority of the collection.

Despite this, some tropical plants reportedly survived, as dedicated employees safeguarded them in kitchens and living rooms until conditions allowed for their return. This resilience highlights the commitment of the staff to preserving the garden's unique botanical heritage during a period of immense hardship.

==== Post-war reconstruction and modernisation ====
Reconstruction of the Botanical Garden's greenhouses began in 1949, with the Victoria House reopening in 1950. By 1958, nine greenhouses were once again accessible to the public. The reconstruction of the Great Tropical Greenhouse, a significant milestone, commenced in 1963 and was completed on 22 May 1968 at a cost of 3.45 million marks (equivalent to approximately 10 million euros today). The project included extensive modernization of the building's technical facilities.

===== Technical updates and innovations =====
During reconstruction, the original silicate glass roof was replaced with acrylic glass, chosen for its advantageous properties, including reduced UV absorption, lower thermal conductivity, lighter weight, and improved malleability, allowing for larger panes (1 m × 2 m). However, a key disadvantage of acrylic glass became evident on 31 July 1969, when a fire in the upper dome caused significant damage to the plastic glazing resulting in over half of the plant life being killed. The affected area was repaired before the onset of winter, and the greenhouse reopened in June 1970.

The heating system was also upgraded during the refurbishment. An air circulation system with 16 fans was installed in the vaulted cellar, distributing warm air via shafts at three different heights and cycling it six to eight times per hour. To maintain optimal humidity levels, a sprinkler system with 66 nozzles was added, capable of dispersing 130 liters of water per minute. Additionally, 96 high-pressure mercury vapor lamps of 400 watts each were installed to supplement lighting.

==== Upgrades in the 1960s ====
During the 1960s renovation, the heating system of the Great Tropical House was thoroughly modernized. An air circulation system with 16 fans was installed in the vaulted cellar, distributing warm air through shafts at three different heights and cycling it six to eight times per hour. To maintain adequate humidity, a sprinkler system with 66 nozzles was added, spraying 130 liters of water per minute. Additionally, 96 high-pressure mercury vapor lamps, each with a power of 400 watts, were installed to enhance lighting conditions for the tropical plants.

==== Urgent repairs and renovations (2004–2009) ====
By the early 2000s, the Great Tropical House required extensive refurbishment due to deteriorating conditions. In March 2004, the building was temporarily closed when rusted ceiling light suspensions posed a safety risk. In January 2006, heating damage in the neighboring Victoria House nearly caused a catastrophic loss of plants, highlighting the urgent need for repairs to the Great Tropical House. Many of its cracked glass panes had only been temporarily glued, and the heating system was at risk of failure.

On 16 February 2006, the Berlin House of Representatives approved a comprehensive refurbishment project with a budget of 16 million euros. The funding was provided by Freie Universität, the Stiftung Deutsche Klassenlotterie, the Berlin Senate Department for Urban Development's environmental relief program, the BMBF's university construction program, and the European Union's European Regional Development Fund.

To prepare for renovations, the plants were relocated to other greenhouses and a specially constructed temporary greenhouse. Renovation work began in August 2006, focusing on structural repairs and modernization. The Great Tropical House was ceremonially reopened on 16 September 2009 and opened to the public the following day.

=== Victoria House ===
The Victoria House, designated for tropical aquatic plants, was situated along the central axis in front of the Great Tropical House. Measuring 10 meters in length and 8 meters in width, it originally showcased giant water lilies, which had been a major attraction in the old botanical garden. To maintain this tradition, the new botanical garden provided the Victoria House with a central position within the greenhouse complex. However, its current connection to the Great Tropical House was only established during renovations between 1966 and 1969.

==== Expansion and enhancements ====
As part of these renovations, the Victoria House was expanded from 214 m^{2} to 254 m^{2}, and a Swamp Plant House was added, providing an additional 170 m^{2} of floor space. The water basin in the Victoria House was enlarged from 70.3 m^{2} to 113 m^{2} to better accommodate the aquatic plant collections, including the iconic giant water lilies.

==== Redesign of the entrance and facilities ====
During the same period, the entrance to the greenhouse complex was completely redesigned. A publicly accessible basement was added beneath the Victoria House, featuring two marsh plant basins and twelve aquariums displaying aquatic plants from around the world. This basement also included service rooms and, later, a shop and café (temporarily relocated to the museum during renovations). The basement provided direct access to the Great Tropical House and greenhouses G and H, serving as starting points for visitor tours.

The newly redesigned greenhouse complex, including the expanded Victoria House and its improved facilities, was officially opened on 19 June 1969, marking a significant modernization of the botanical garden's infrastructure.

==== Renovation of Victoria House (2013–2018) ====
While the Great Tropical House was completed in 2009, the Victoria House remained closed. Renovations for the Victoria House began in 2013, with an initial reopening planned for September 2015. However, construction defects caused delays, and the Victoria House ultimately reopened on 16 June 2018, marking the culmination of significant restoration efforts for both iconic greenhouses.

=== Mediterranean House ===
A notable architectural highlight is the cold house for subtropical plants, also called the Mediterranean House. Located a short distance from the main greenhouse complex to avoid shading, even during low winter sun, this greenhouse has a three-aisled structure and two portal towers, giving it a cathedral-like appearance. The house covers a floor area of 878 m^{2} and has a ridge height of 15.8 meters. It underwent a complete renovation between 1989 and 1992.

=== Colonial Garden Greenhouse ===
The small greenhouse for colonial crops was situated in the colonial garden near the boiler house. Simple in design, it had a height of 3.70 meters and a floor area of 134 m^{2}. This greenhouse no longer exists today.

These structures reflect both historical functionality and modern adaptation, demonstrating the evolution of greenhouse design in response to scientific and environmental needs.

== Other Structures ==
=== Pavilions ===
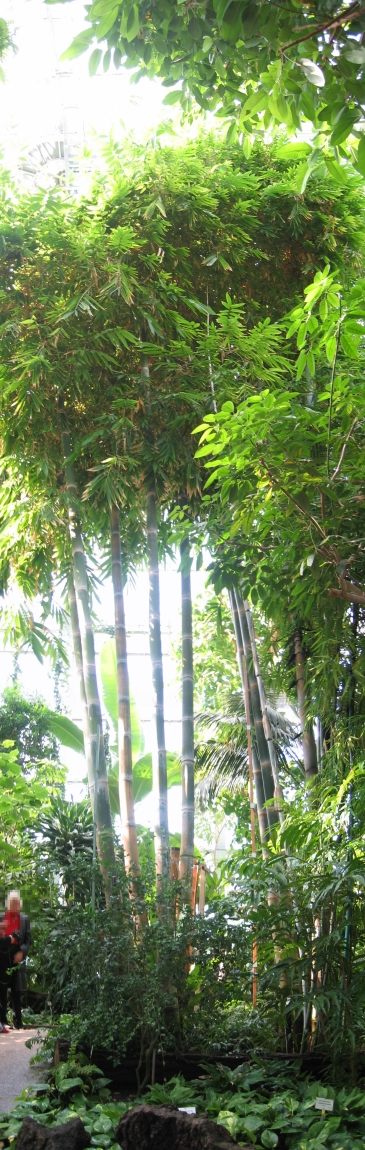
Giant bamboo in the Great Pavilion

Numerous outdoor installations offer the possibility to relax, study literature, or search for protection against the rain. Alfred Koerner proved his comprehensive skills by matching the constructions to diverse styles as well as the botanical surroundings. Parts of these pavilions are connected to ornamental elements.

A Japanese arbour is situated in the centre of an ornamental garden named "Japanese Love", within the sector which represent the flora and fauna of East Asia.

The Arbour of Roses is situated in the centre of the arboretum. In this case Koerner built a semi–circular building from basalt lava. Its style can be described as Romanesque. It is surrounded by wild roses which overgrow the arbour. These roses show their blossoms in front of the dark building. Nowadays an open hall which is suitable for lectures is situated in the systematic section within widely spread meadows. Engler and his students used to go there to hold lectures.

=== Water facilities ===
Fresh water is supplied by two 50 metres [m] (164 ft) deep fountains. To deliver the water, vapour pumps were added and supplied with heat by the heating station. The water was pumped directly to the mains system of the garden as well as to the 550 m^{3} (19,423 cu ft) large water tower located behind the conservatories. The pumping system was designed for a daily output of 1,000 m^{3} (35,315 cu ft) of water. The technology was updated to make the pumps operated by electricity. The deep well still ensures the water supply networks.

=== Heating facilities ===
Special requirements were placed on the heating facility because of the variety of plants requiring different growing conditions. Continuous operation during night and summer was required for cultivation, so an independent heating facility with three warm water kettles and a boiler was built in the Botanical Garden.

The heating facilities had to meet the following challenges:

- provision of the heating systems with hot water steam and low pressure steam;
- supply of the greenhouses with water vapour for air humidification and tropical mist;
- supply of the nursery with warm water; and
- supply of the pumping station, the rainwater pressure pipe, the electrical lighting and the electrical working machines with energy.

Until the decommissioning of the plant, it had been run with approximately 1,500 metric tons (1,500 long tons; 1,700 short tons) of coal a year. The Botanical Garden was connected to the network of the district heating plant Steglitz on 13 September 1967. Since then it has been the main source for heating energy for the Botanical Garden. Annual energy consumption levels amount to 8,580 gigacalories (Gcal), the equivalent of 9,970,000 kilowatt-hours (kWh), from which a third is used for the Great Pavilion. Its renovation has reduced the energy consumption levels significantly, and when complete, energy consumption levels will be reduced by one-fifth.

== Bunker ==
The construction of a bunker about 10 m (33 ft) below the Fichtenberg began in 1943. Access was through two entrances from the courtyard of the Botanical Garden. It was built for the SS Main Economic and Administrative Office which was located about 500 m (1,640 ft) away in 126–135 Unter den Eichen. The bunker was used for storage of the file inventory and to protect staff during alerts. It was of an unusual layout and construction with only a few rooms and several long tunnels. There was a tunnel shield at the end of one tunnel that remained after construction of the bunker ended in 1944. After the end of World War II, the entrances to the bunker were blown up. Some of the corridors also had collapsed by then. Today, the construction serves as winter quarters for bats.

== Museum and herbarium ==
Between 1819 and 1838 the explorer, botanist and poet Adalbert von Chamisso worked as a curator of the herbarium. In 1879 the herbarium in the old botanical garden gained its own building and was able to present its collector's items to the public. A year later a botanical teaching exhibition was introduced. This was the prequel to the Botanical Museum.

After its relocation in 1907 to Dahlem the museum gained a considerably bigger exhibition space on three floors. These were used for expanding exhibitions about geobotany and paleobotany. The rebuilding began in 1957 after the destruction of buildings and many exhibits. At this time the museum had a surface area of only one floor. After the relocation of the herbarium and the library to the new east wing, the museum could be expanded. On 11 March 1991, the second floor was introduced. In 2004–2005 the first floor was reworked and redesigned. Now the museum is seen as an addition to the garden and presents botanic topics that are not in the garden, including the historical progress, the progress within a year, inner plant structures, enlarged micro-structures, spreading of species, plant products and the use of plants.

== Cemetery ==
From the access at the Königin-Luise-Platz there is a small cemetery to the left of the greenhouse complex where Friedrich Althoff, who died in 1908, was entombed. When Althoff was university tutor, he promoted the development of the university location of Dahlem and was buried in the Botanical Garden at his own request. The tomb of Althoff was created in 1911 by Hans Krückeberg. It has a resemblance to a classical sarcophagus including a dolorous female figure base in marble. This figure symbolises science in mourning.

Also buried in the cemetery was African explorer and curator of the Botanical Garden Georg Schweinfurth who died in 1925. The third tomb belongs to Adolf Engler (died 1930) and his wife Marie (died 1943). Engler was the first director of the Botanical Garden.

== Botanical Garden publications ==
The Botanical Garden together with the Botanical Museum publish two scientific journals: Willdenowia and Englera. In addition, Index Seminum and publications on the current operations and exposure of these facilities are published. In the nineteenth century Jahrbuch des Königlichen Botanischen Gartens und des Botanischen Museums zu Berlin [Yearbook of the Royal Botanical Garden and the Botanical Museum in Berlin] was also published.

== See also ==
- List of tourist attractions in Berlin
