= Dyckerhoff & Widmann =

German construction company

Dyckerhoff & Widmann AG (Dywidag)
- Industry: Construction
- Predecessor: Friedr. Remy Nachfolger; Siemens-Bauunion
- Founded: 1865
- Fate: Split up after insolvency
- Successor: Walter Bau AG
- Headquarters: Munich, Germany
- Key people: Eugen Dyckerhoff (founder); Gottlieb Widmann (founder)
- Website: dywidag.com

Dyckerhoff & Widmann AG (Dywidag) was a construction company based in Munich, Germany (formerly based in Karlsruhe, Wiesbaden and Berlin, Germany).

== History ==
The company was founded under the name Lang & Co. in 1865 by the German cement pioneer Wilhelm Gustav Dyckerhoff (1805–1894) in Karlsruhe, Germany. In the early years the company was mainly engaged in the production of concrete components. In 1866 Dyckerhoff's son Eugen Dyckerhoff (1844–1924) entered the company. He and his father-in-law Gottlieb Widmann changed the company's name to Dyckerhoff & Widmann and made it one of the leading companies for concrete construction in Germany. Starting in the field of construction engineering in the 1880s, the company soon got contracts for impressive buildings like the Centennial Hall (Jahrhunderthalle) in Wrocław.

The company introduced many innovations in the field of concrete construction. Eugen Dyckerhoff developed the Stampfbeton, a compressed concrete that became a standard for concrete construction in Germany in the 19th century. At the end of the 1920s the company developed the Zeiss-Dywidag-System. For this concrete shell construction system the company was awarded an Edward Longstreth Medal of Merit by the Franklin Institute in 1938. Until the 1960s Dyckerhoff & Widmann built large quantities of buildings with shell constructions. The company Dyckerhoff & Widmann also played an important role for the establishment of prestressed concrete and the cantilever method in Germany.

In 1907 the company Dyckerhoff & Widmann moved its headquarters to Wiesbaden, and after World War II it finally moved to Munich. The companies Siemens-Bauunion (1972) and Union-Bau AG (1991) were taken over by Dyckerhoff & Widmann. In 2001 the company became part of the Walter Bau AG, a building contractor. With the insolvency of the Walter Bau AG in 2005 the former company Dyckerhoff & Widmann was split up. The biggest part of the business was taken over by the Austrian building company Strabag.

== Nazi Concentration Camps ==
During World War II Dyckerhoff & Widmann used slave labour from Camp No. 36 at the new sub-camp of Auschwitz III called "Arbeitslager Blechhammer". Most of these would die in 1945 during the death marches and finally in Buchenwald.

== Bibliography ==
- Stegmann, Knut: Early Concrete Constructions in Germany - A Review with Special Regard to the Building Company Dyckerhoff & Widmann In: Karl-Eugen Kurrer, Werner Lorenz and Volker Wetzk (eds.): Proceedings of the Third International Congress on Construction History Berlin, 2009. Vol. 3, pp. 1371–1378. ISBN 978-3-936033-31-1 open access: PDF
- Stegmann, Knut: Das Bauunternehmen Dyckerhoff & Widmann. Zu den Anfängen des Betonbaus 1865-1918. Tübingen/Berlin, 2014 (in German, with an overview of the complete company's history). ISBN 978-3803007537
- Dyckerhoff & Widmann (ed.): Dyckerhoff & Widmann Aktiengesellschaft Biebrich a. Rhein, mit Zweigniederlassungen in Karlsruhe, Nürnberg, Dresden, Berlin, München und Hamburg. Biebrich, 1908.
- Dyckerhoff & Widmann (ed.): Dywidag-Bildband. Bauten der Dyckerhoff & Widmann AG 1865–1990. München, 1990.
