= Résal effect =

Concept in structural engineering

The Résal effect (named after the French engineer Louis-Jean Résal) is a structural engineering term which refers to the way the compressive force acting on a flange of a tapered beam reduces the effective shear force acting on the beam.
