= Aechmea haltonii =

Scientific classification
- Kingdom: Plantae
- Clade: Tracheophytes
- Clade: Angiosperms
- Clade: Monocots
- Clade: Commelinids
- Order: Poales
- Family: Bromeliaceae
- Genus: Aechmea
- Subgenus: Aechmea subg. Podaechmea
- Species: A. haltonii

Binomial name
- Aechmea haltonii H.Luther

Species of plant

Aechmea haltonii is a bromeliad, a flowering plant in the genus Aechmea which is endemic to Panama.

== Cultivars ==
- Aechmea 'Anton'
