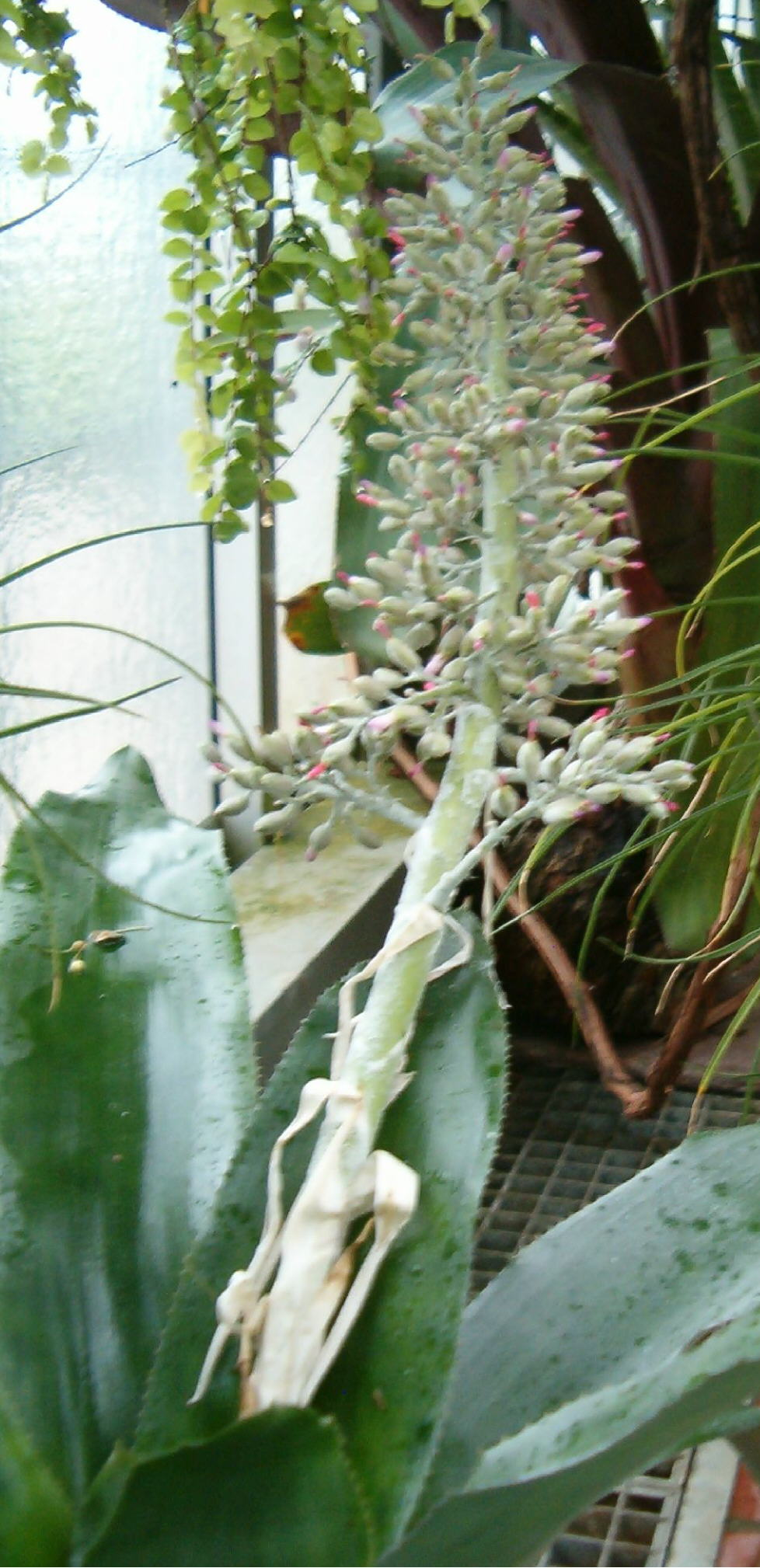

Scientific classification
- Kingdom: Plantae
- Clade: Tracheophytes
- Clade: Angiosperms
- Clade: Monocots
- Clade: Commelinids
- Order: Poales
- Family: Bromeliaceae
- Genus: Aechmea
- Subgenus: Aechmea subg. Podaechmea
- Species: A. mexicana

Binomial name
- Aechmea mexicana Baker

Synonyms
- Podaechmea mexicana (Baker) L.B.Sm. & W.J.Kress; Hoplophytum grande E.Morren ex Baker; Aechmea bernoulliana Wittm.

= Aechmea mexicana =

Species of flowering plant

Aechmea mexicana is a plant species in the genus Aechmea. This species is native to central and southern Mexico, Central America, Colombia and Ecuador.
