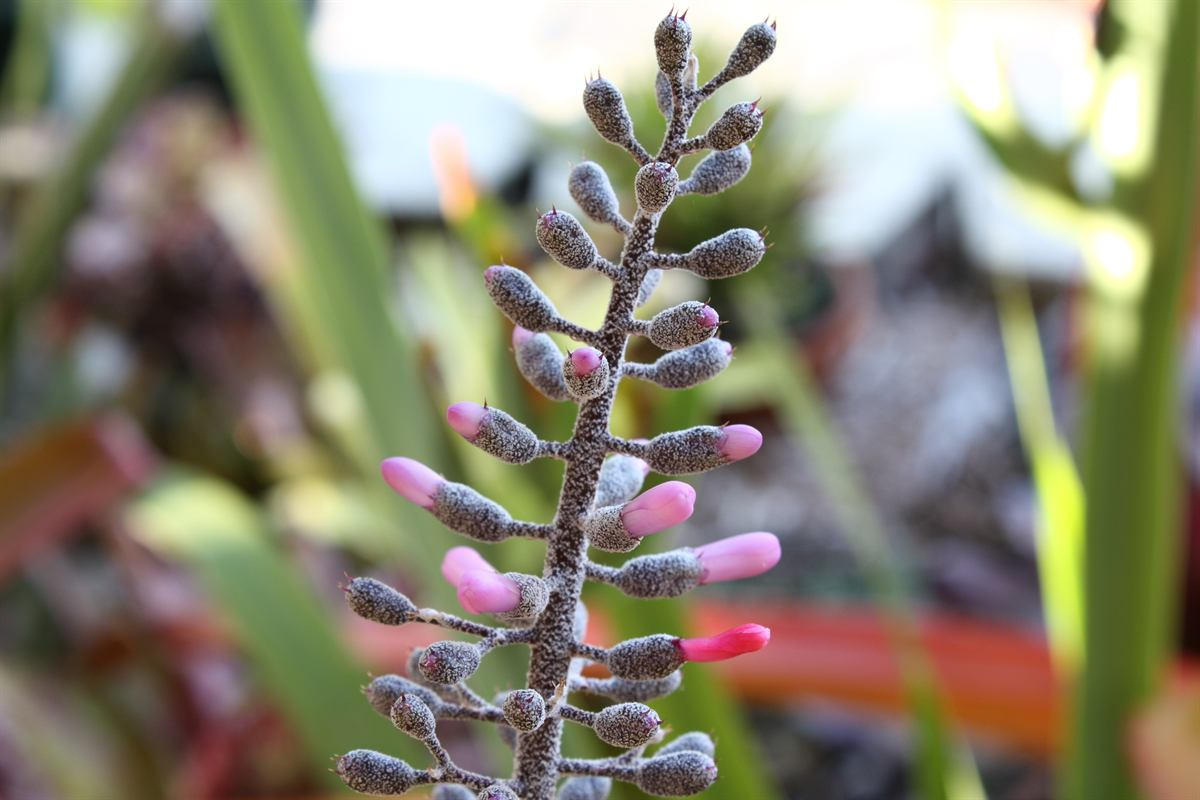

Scientific classification
- Kingdom: Plantae
- Clade: Tracheophytes
- Clade: Angiosperms
- Clade: Monocots
- Clade: Commelinids
- Order: Poales
- Family: Bromeliaceae
- Genus: Aechmea
- Subgenus: Aechmea subg. Podaechmea
- Species: A. lueddemanniana

Binomial name
- Aechmea lueddemanniana (K.Koch) Mez

Synonyms
- Pironneava lueddemanniana K.Koch; Podaechmea lueddemanniana (K.Koch) L.B.Sm. & W.J.Kress; Aechmea caerulea E.Morren; Lamprococcus caerulescens Regel; Hoplophytum caerulescens (Regel) E.Morren; Aechmea caerulescens (Regel) Baker; Aechmea galeottii Baker; Podaechmea galeottii (Baker) L.B.Sm. & W.J.Kress

= Aechmea lueddemanniana =

Species of flowering plant

Aechmea lueddemanniana is a species of flowering plant in the family Bromeliaceae. It is native to Costa Rica, Guatemala, Belize, Honduras, Nicaragua and southern Mexico as far north as Veracruz.

The plant is widely cultivated as an ornamental.

== Description ==
The pink flowers are tube-shaped and the flowering period extends from June to August. The fruits are purplish berries. This plant prefers partially shaded areas.

== Gallery ==
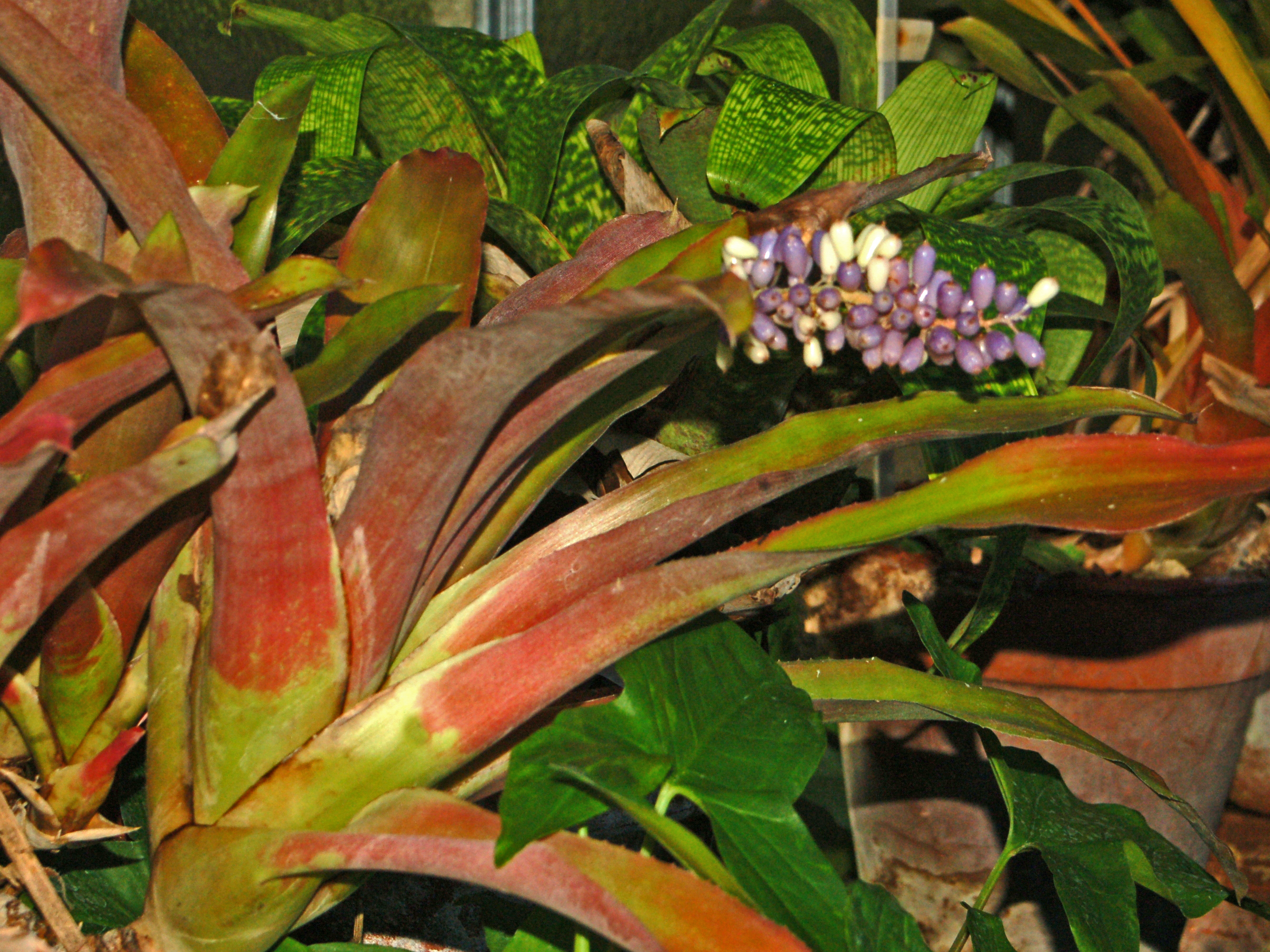
Plant of Aechmea lueddemanniana at Orto Botanico dell'Università di Genova

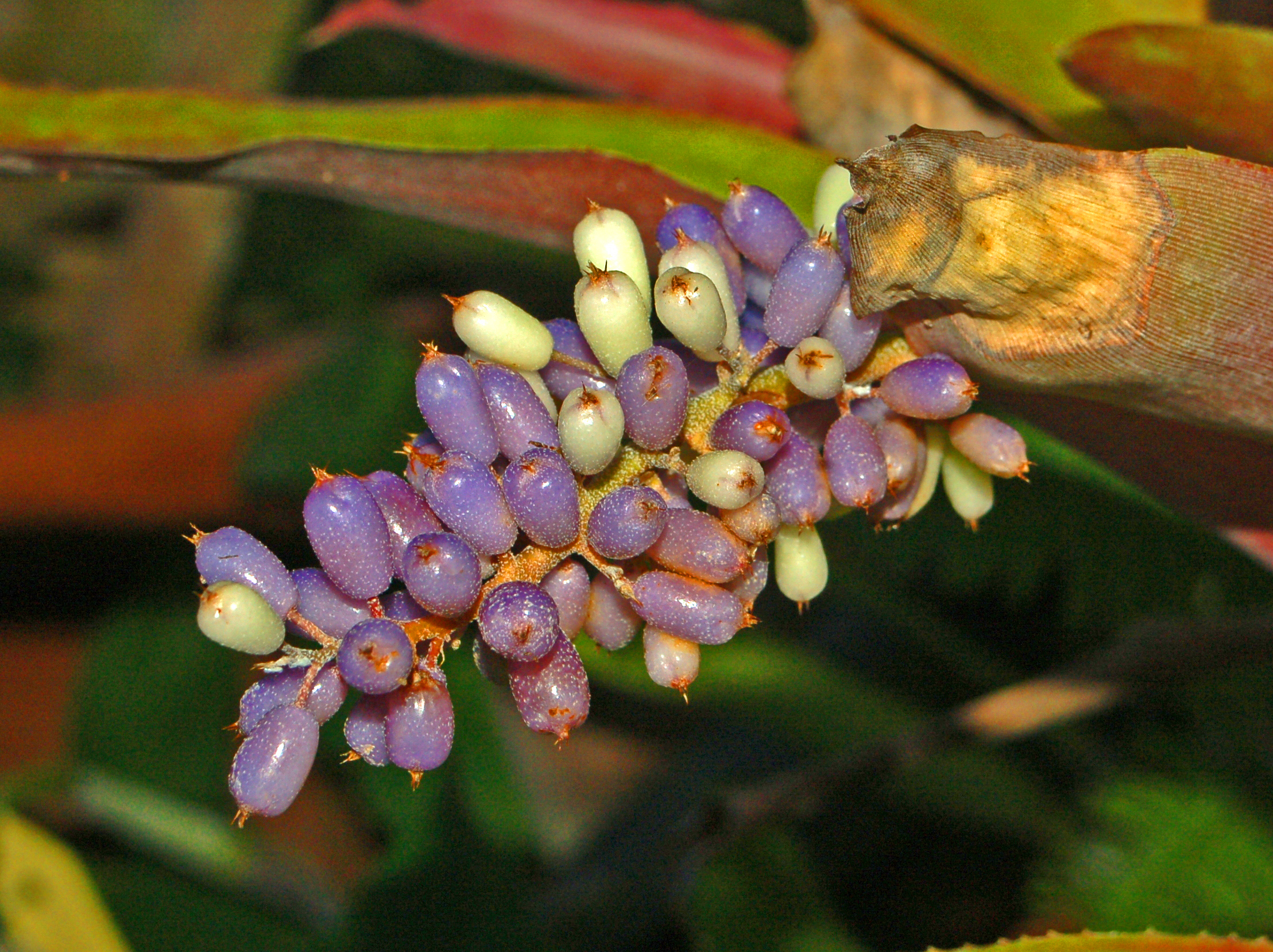
Berries of Aechmea lueddemanniana at Orto Botanico dell'Università di Genova
