= Louis-Jean Résal =

French civil engineer

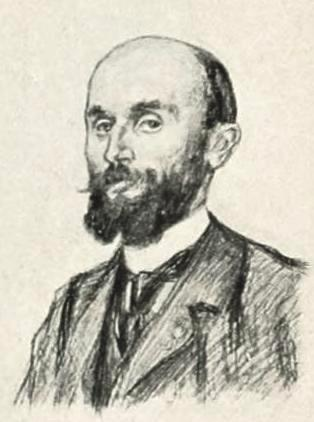
Portrait of Louis-Jean Résal

Jean Résal (22 October 1854, in Besançon – 14 November 1919, in Paris) was a French civil engineer. He was a professor of mechanical engineering at the École polytechnique, and designed several metal bridges in France, especially bridges above the Seine in Paris:

The career of the brilliant student of the École des ponts ParisTech was always an upward ladder: service in the Roads and Bridges Department at the Loire-Atlantique Département and thereafter in the shipping authority in Paris. Résal succeeded the student of Saint-Venant, Alfred-Aimé Flamant (1839-1915), at the Chair of Strength of Materials at the École des ponts ParisTech in 1892. Although Résal had already published a two-volume work on arch bridges together with Ernest Degrand (1822-1892), he concentrated on the theory and practice of steel bridges from a very early stage and had a profound influence on steel bridges at the transition from the discipline-formation to the consolidation period of theory of structures.

- Nantes Résal Bridge (rail), destroyed during the Second World War, rebuilt in concrete
- Road bridge over the Erdre (Nantes), appointed first bridge Barbin, then Pont du General de la Motte Rouge.
- Mirabeau bridge in Paris (road bridge, 93 m range)
- Alexandre-III Bridge (Paris) (highway bridge, 107 m range)
- Bercy bridge (Paris)
- Gateway Debilly (Paris)
- Bridge of Notre-Dame (Paris)

The bold steel arches of the Pont Général-de-la-Motte-Rouge (1885) in Nantes, Pont Mirabeau (1896) in Paris, Pont de l'Université (1899), Pont Alexandre III (1900) and Pont Notre-Dame (1914) in Paris set standards for steel bridges. All those bridges listed could only be built as a result of Résal’s research into elasticity and the strength of structural steels, work that he summarised in a monograph (1892). Furthermore, Résal made a lasting contribution to earth pressure theory (1903, 1910), which Albert Caquot would use successfully as his starting point.

The Résal effect is named after him.

== Works ==
- Ponts métalliques, 2 Volumes 1885, Online
- With Ernest Degrand: Ponts en maçonnerie, 2 Volumes, 1887, Volume 1 Online Volume 2 Online
- Constructions métalliques, élasticité et résistance des matériaux, fonte, fer et acier, 1892, Online
- Résistance des matériaux. Cours de l'École des ponts et chaussées, 1892; 1922, Online
- mit Amédée Alby: Notes sur la construction du pont Alexandre III, 1899
- Stabilité des constructions. Cours de l'École des ponts et chaussées, 1901, Online
- Poussée des terres, stabilité des murs de soutènement, 1903, Online
- Cours de ponts métalliques professé à l'École nationale des ponts et chaussées. Ponts en arcs et ponts suspendus, 3 Bände, 1912–1922, Online

== Achievements ==
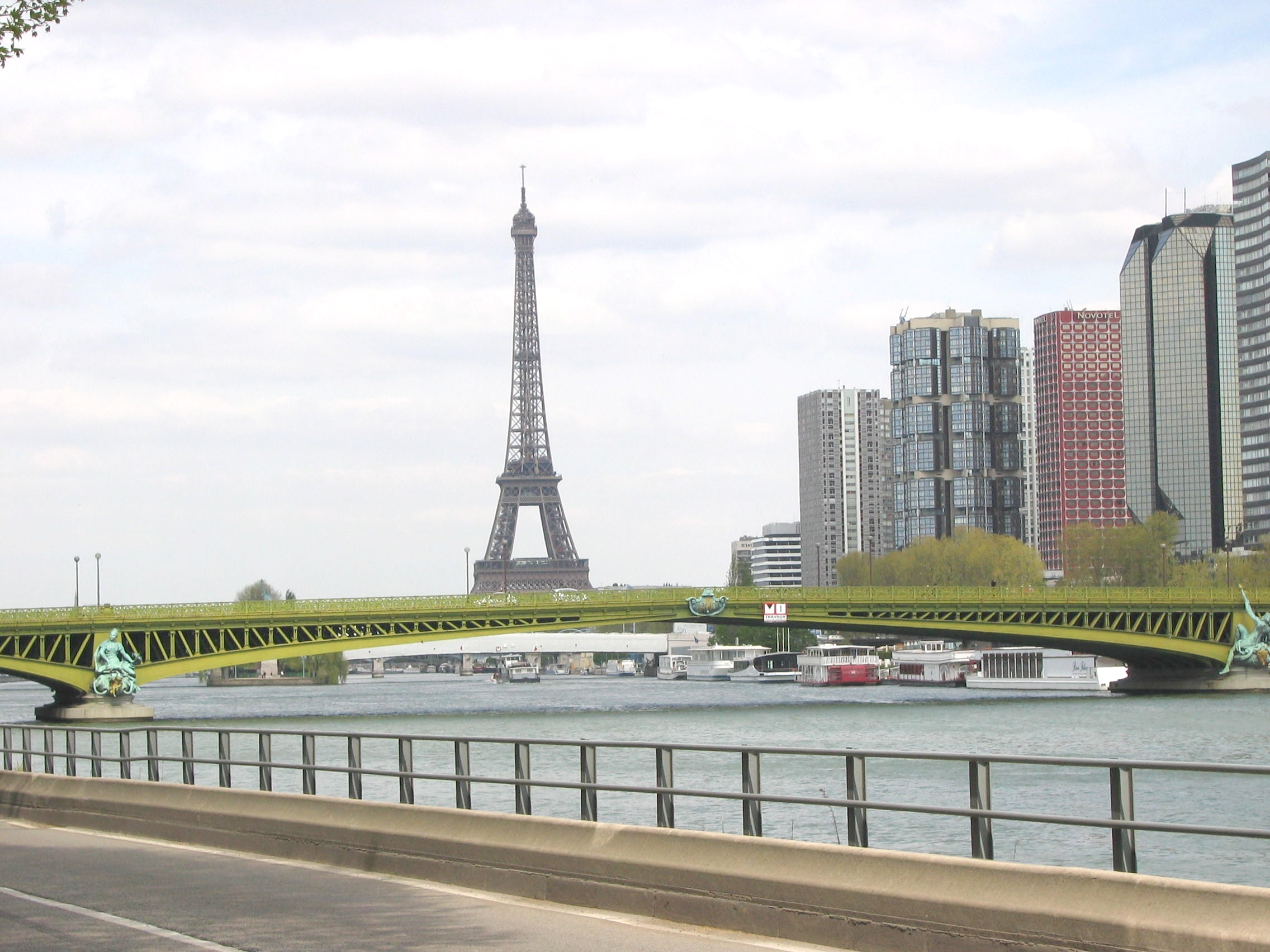
Mirabeau bridge

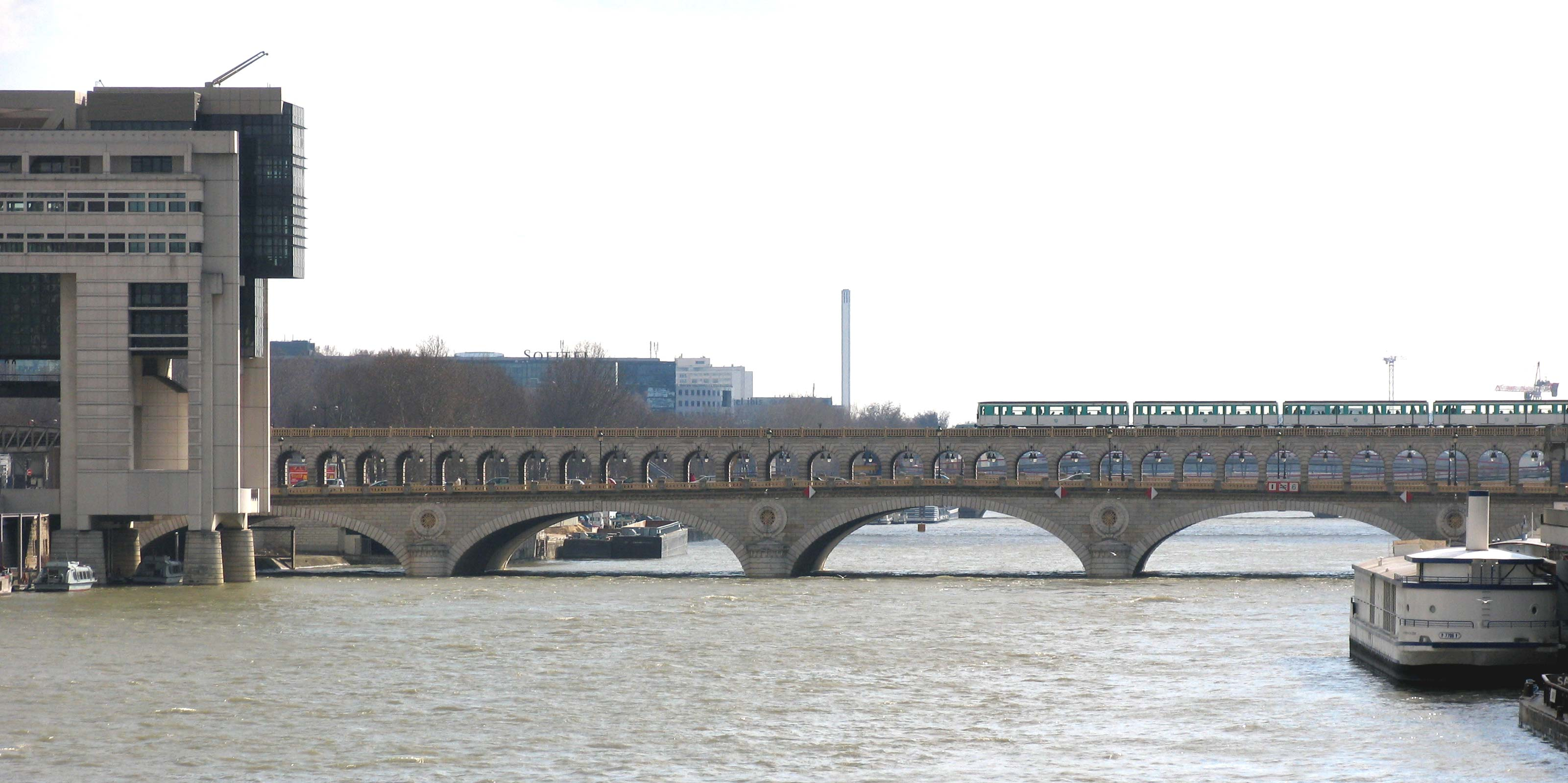
Bercy bridge

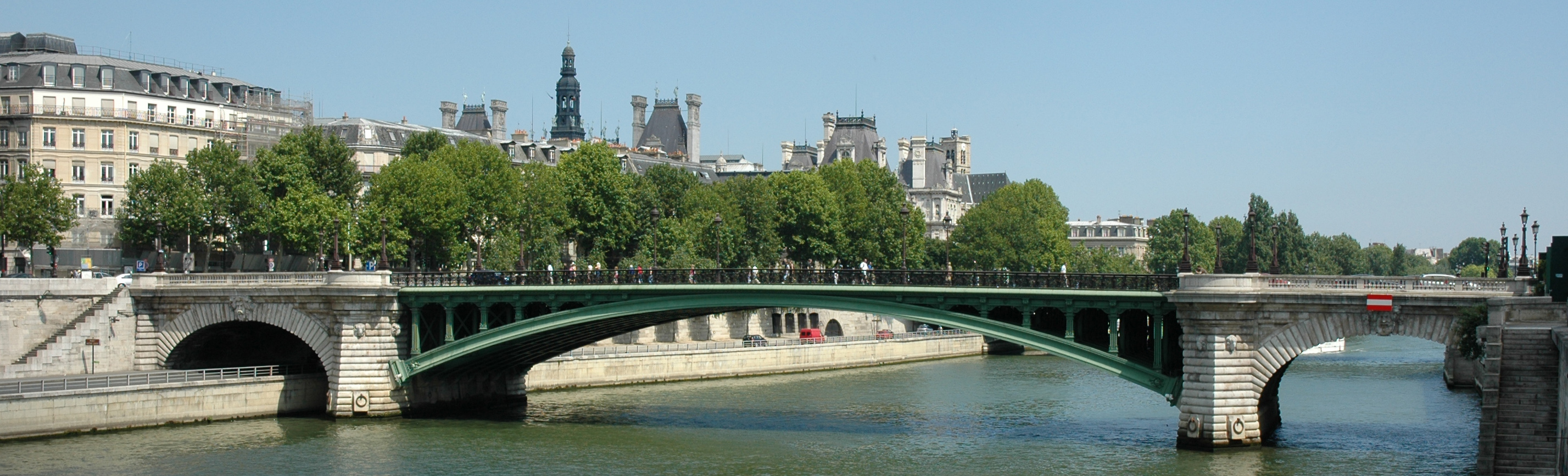
Bridge of Notre-Dame
