= Cantilever method =

The cantilever method is an approximate method for calculating shear forces and moments developed in beams and columns of a frame or structure due to lateral loads. The applied lateral loads typically include wind loads and earthquake loads, which must be taken into consideration while designing buildings. The assumptions used in this method are that the points of contraflexure (or points of inflection of the moment diagram) in both the vertical and horizontal members are located at the midpoint of the member, and that the direct stresses in the columns are proportional to their distances from the centroidal axis of the frame. The frame is analysed in step-wise (iterative) fashion, and the results can then be described by force diagrams drawn up at the end of the process. The method is quite versatile and can be used to analyse frames of any number of storeys or floors.

The position of the centroidal axis (the center of gravity line for the frame) is determined by using the areas of the end columns and interior columns. The cantilever method is considered one of the two primary approximate methods (the other being the portal method) for indeterminate structural analysis of frames for lateral loads. Its use is recommended for frames that are taller than they are wide, and therefore behave similarly to a beam cantilevered up from the ground.

== See also ==
- Conjugate beam method
