= Contraflexure =

Location along a beam at which its bending moment equals zero

In solid mechanics, a point along a beam under a lateral load is known as a point of contraflexure if the bending moment about the point equals zero. In a bending moment diagram, it is the point at which the bending moment curve intersects with the zero line (i.e. where the bending moment reverses direction along the beam). Knowing the place of the contraflexure is especially useful when designing reinforced concrete or structural steel beams and also for designing bridges.

Flexural reinforcement may be reduced at this point. However, to omit reinforcement at the point of contraflexure entirely is inadvisable as the actual location is unlikely to realistically be defined with confidence. Additionally, an adequate quantity of reinforcement should extend beyond the point of contraflexure to develop bond strength and to facilitate shear force transfer.

== See also ==
- Deformation
- Engineering mechanics
- Flexural rigidity
- Flexural stress
- Fluid mechanics
- Inflection point
- Strength of materials
