= Christian Otto Mohr =

German structural engineer (1835–1918)

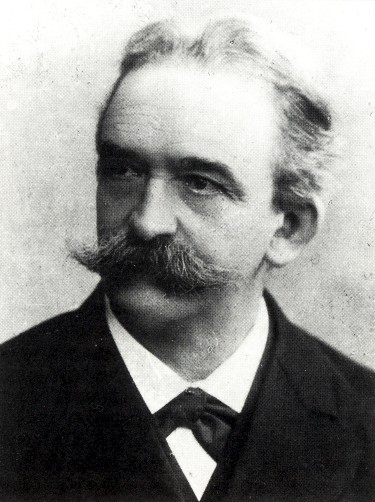
- Born: Christian Otto Mohr; 8 October 1835; Wesselburen, Duchy of Holstein
- Died: 2 October 1918 (aged 82); Dresden, German Empire
- Education: Leibniz University Hannover
- Known for: Mohr's circle Mohr–Coulomb theory Moment-area theorem Statically indeterminate structure
- Scientific career
- Fields: Solid mechanics Structural engineering
- Workplaces: TU Dresden; University of Stuttgart

Christian Otto Mohr (8 October 1835 – 2 October 1918) was a German civil engineer. He is renowned for his contributions to the field of structural engineering, such as Mohr's circle, and for his study of stress.

== Biography ==
He was born on 8 October 1835 to a landowning family in Wesselburen in the Holstein region. At the age of 16 attended the Polytechnic School in Hannover.

Starting in 1855, his early working life was spent in railroad engineering for the Hanover and Oldenburg state railways, designing some famous bridges and making some of the earliest uses of steel trusses.

Even during his early railway years, Mohr had developed an interest in the theories of mechanics and the strength of materials. In 1867, he became professor of mechanics at Stuttgart Polytechnic, and in 1873 at Dresden Polytechnic. Mohr had a direct and unpretentious lecturing style that was popular with his students. In addition to a lone textbook, Mohr published many research papers on the theory of structures and strength of materials.

In 1874, Mohr formalised the idea of a statically indeterminate structure.

Mohr was an enthusiast for graphical tools and developed the method, for visually representing stress in three dimensions, previously proposed by Carl Culmann. In 1882, he famously developed the graphical method for analysing stress known as Mohr's circle and used it to propose an early theory of strength based on shear stress. He also developed the Williot-Mohr diagram for truss displacements and the Maxwell-Mohr method for analysing statically indeterminate structures, it can also be used to determine the displacement of truss nodes and forces acting on each member. The Maxwell-Mohr method is also referred to as the virtual force method for redundant trusses.

He retired in 1900, yet continued his scientific work in Dresden until his death on 2 October 1918.

== See also ==
- Slope deflection method

== Bibliography ==
- Timoshenko, S. P. (1953), History of Strength of Materials ISBN 0-07-064725-9
- Mohr O. Über die Darstellung des Spannungszustandes und des Deformationszustandes eines Körperelementes und über die Anwendung derselben in der Festigkeitslehre //Der Civilingenieur. – 1882. – Т. 28. – №.2. – С. 113-156.
