= Constantin Starck =

German sculptor

- Born: 18 February 1866; Riga, Latvia
- Died: 11 September 1939 (aged 73); Berlin, Germany
- Occupation: Sculptor

Constantin Starck (18 February 1866 – 11 September 1939) was a German sculptor. His work was part of the sculpture event in the art competition at the 1932 Summer Olympics.
