= Bending moment =

Force tending to bend a structural element

Shear and moment diagram for a simply supported beam with a concentrated load at mid-span.

In solid mechanics, a bending moment is an internal force couple within a structural element, caused by applied external forces causing bending. A bending moment is a moment of force, and is usually expressed as acting relative to the neutral axis of the element's cross section.

When external forces are applied to beams or plates causing bending, this causes internal compressive and tensile forces to act on the cross-section of the element; the bending moment at a given cross-section is the sum of the products of each of these internal forces and its distance from the neutral axis.

Bending moments can be used in conjunction with material properties to model resistance to bending related failure, such as flexural yielding and lateral-torsional buckling. This is used in the design and analysis of elements in the field of structural and mechanical engineering.

A bending moment is dimensionally equivalent to torque; it is a force multiplied by a distance so is typically expressed in units of Newton-metres (N·m), or the pound-foot (lb·ft).

== In beams ==
The internal loads orthogonal to the cross-section of a beam can be resolved into a resultant force and a resultant couple. For equilibrium, the moment created by external forces/moments must be balanced by the couple induced by the internal loads. The resultant internal couple is called the bending moment while the resultant internal force is called the shear force (if it is along the plane of element) or the normal force (if it is transverse to the plane of the element). Normal force is also termed as axial force.

Bending moments can vary across the length of beams; this distribution is illustrated using a graph called a bending moment diagram. According to Euler–Bernoulli beam theory, the bending moment diagram is the double integral of the applied forces to the beam with respect to a beam's length dimension.

The diagram shows a beam which is simply supported (free to rotate and therefore lacking bending moments) at both ends; the ends can only react to the shear loads. Other beams can have both ends fixed (known as encastre beam); therefore each end support has both bending moments and shear reaction loads. Beams can also have one end fixed and one end simply supported. The simplest type of beam is the cantilever, which is fixed at one end and is free at the other end (neither simple nor fixed). In reality, beam supports are usually neither absolutely fixed nor absolutely rotating freely.

The bending moment at a section through a structural element may be defined as the sum of the moments about that section of all external forces acting to one side of that section. The forces and moments on either side of the section must be equal in order to counteract each other and maintain a state of equilibrium so the same bending moment will result from summing the moments, regardless of which side of the section is selected. If clockwise bending moments are taken as negative, then a negative bending moment within an element will cause "hogging", and a positive moment will cause "sagging". It is therefore clear that a point of zero bending moment within a beam is a point of contraflexure—that is, the point of transition from hogging to sagging or vice versa.

=== Euler-Bernoulli beam theory ===
Tensile and compressive stresses increase proportionally with bending moment, but are also dependent on the second moment of area of the cross-section of a beam (that is, the shape of the cross-section, such as a circle, square or I-beam being common structural shapes). Failure in bending will occur when the bending moment is sufficient to induce tensile/compressive stresses greater than the yield stress of the material throughout the entire cross-section. In structural analysis, this bending failure is called a plastic hinge, since the full load carrying ability of the structural element is not reached until the full cross-section is past the yield stress. It is possible that failure of a structural element in shear may occur before failure in bending, however the mechanics of failure in shear and in bending are different.

Moments are calculated by multiplying the external vector forces (loads or reactions) by the vector distance at which they are applied. When analysing an entire element, it is sensible to calculate moments at both ends of the element, at the beginning, centre and end of any uniformly distributed loads, and directly underneath any point loads. Of course any "pin-joints" within a structure allow free rotation, and so zero moment occurs at these points as there is no way of transmitting turning forces from one side to the other.

It is more common to use the convention that a clockwise bending moment to the left of the point under consideration is taken as positive. This then corresponds to the second derivative of a function which, when positive, indicates a curvature that is 'lower at the centre' i.e. sagging. When defining moments and curvatures in this way calculus can be more readily used to find slopes and deflections.

Critical values within the beam are most commonly annotated using a bending moment diagram, where negative moments are plotted to scale above a horizontal line and positive below. Bending moment varies linearly over unloaded sections, and parabolically over uniformly loaded sections.

Engineering descriptions of the computation of bending moments can be confusing because of unexplained sign conventions and implicit assumptions. The descriptions below use vector mechanics to compute moments of force and bending moments in an attempt to explain, from first principles, why particular sign conventions are chosen.

== Computing the moment of force ==
Computing the moment of force in a beam.

An important part of determining bending moments in practical problems is the computation of moments of force. Let $\mathbf{F}$ be a force vector acting at a point A in a body. The moment of this force about a reference point (O) is defined as

$$\mathbf{M}  = \mathbf{r} \times \mathbf{F}$$

where $\mathbf{M}$ is the moment vector and $\mathbf{r}$ is the position vector from the reference point (O) to the point of application of the force (A). The $\times$ symbol indicates the vector cross product. For many problems, it is more convenient to compute the moment of force about an axis that passes through the reference point O. If the unit vector along the axis is $\mathbf{e}$, the moment of force about the axis is defined as

$$M = \mathbf{e}\cdot\mathbf{M} = \mathbf{e}\cdot(\mathbf{r} \times \mathbf{F})$$

where $\cdot$ indicates the vector dot product.

=== Example ===
The adjacent figure shows a beam that is acted upon by a force $F$. If the coordinate system is defined by the three unit vectors $\mathbf{e}_x, \mathbf{e}_y, \mathbf{e}_z$, we have the following

$$\mathbf{F} = 0\,\mathbf{e}_x - F\,\mathbf{e}_y + 0\,\mathbf{e}_z
\quad \text{and} \quad \mathbf{r} = x\,\mathbf{e}_x + 0\,\mathbf{e}_y + 0\,\mathbf{e}_z \,.$$

Therefore,

$$\mathbf{M} = \mathbf{r}\times\mathbf{F} = \left|\begin{matrix}\mathbf{e}_x &  \mathbf{e}_y &  \mathbf{e}_z \\ x & 0 & 0 \\ 0 & -F & 0
\end{matrix}\right| = -Fx\,\mathbf{e}_z \,.$$

The moment about the axis $\mathbf{e}_z$ is then

$$M_z = \mathbf{e}_z\cdot\mathbf{M} = -Fx \,.$$

=== Sign conventions ===
The negative value shows that a moment that tends to rotate a body clockwise around an axis pointed towards the viewer should have a negative sign. This is further illustrated by the following example with the axis pointed away from the viewer. We choose another right handed coordinate system with $\mathbf{E}_x = \mathbf{e}_x, \mathbf{E}_y = -\mathbf{e}_z, \mathbf{E}_z = \mathbf{e}_y$, we have

$$\mathbf{F} = 0\,\mathbf{E}_x + 0\,\mathbf{E}_y -F\,\mathbf{E}_z
\quad \text{and} \quad \mathbf{r} = x\,\mathbf{E}_x + 0\,\mathbf{E}_y + 0\,\mathbf{E}_z \,.$$

Then,

$$\mathbf{M} = \mathbf{r}\times\mathbf{F} = \left|\begin{matrix}\mathbf{E}_x &  \mathbf{E}_y &  \mathbf{E}_z \\ x & 0 & 0 \\ 0 & 0 & -F
\end{matrix}\right| = Fx\,\mathbf{E}_y
\quad \text{and} \quad M_y = \mathbf{E}_y\cdot\mathbf{M} = Fx \,.$$

For this new choice of axes, a positive moment tends to rotate body clockwise around an axis, since the axis points away from the viewer. Alternatively, if we were to view the same system with the axis pointed towards us, from this perspective the load tends to rotate the body anticlockwise.

== Computing the bending moment ==
In a rigid body or in an unconstrained deformable body, the application of a moment of force causes a pure rotation. But if a deformable body is constrained, it develops internal forces in response to the external force so that equilibrium is maintained. An example is shown in the figure below. These internal forces will cause local deformations in the body.

For equilibrium, the sum of the internal force vectors is equal to the negative of the sum of the applied external forces, and the sum of the moment vectors created by the internal forces is equal to the negative of the moment of the external force. The internal force and moment vectors are oriented in such a way that the total force (internal + external) and moment (external + internal) of the system is zero. The internal moment vector is called the bending moment.

Though bending moments have been used to determine the stress states in arbitrary shaped structures, the physical interpretation of the computed stresses is problematic. However, physical interpretations of bending moments in beams and plates have a straightforward interpretation as the stress resultants in a cross-section of the structural element. For example, in a beam in the figure, the bending moment vector due to stresses in the cross-section A perpendicular to the x-axis is given by

$$\mathbf{M}_x = \int_A \mathbf{r} \times (\sigma_{xx} \mathbf{e}_x + \sigma_{xy} \mathbf{e}_y + \sigma_{xz} \mathbf{e}_z)\, dA
\quad \text{where} \quad
\mathbf{r} = y\,\mathbf{e}_y + z\,\mathbf{e}_z \,.$$

Expanding this expression we have,

$$\mathbf{M}_x = \int_A \left(-y\sigma_{xx}\mathbf{e}_z + y\sigma_{xz}\mathbf{e}_x + z\sigma_{xx}\mathbf{e}_y - z\sigma_{xy}\mathbf{e}_x\right)dA =: M_{xx}\,\mathbf{e}_x + M_{xy}\,\mathbf{e}_y + M_{xz}\,\mathbf{e}_z\,.$$

We define the bending moment components as

$$\begin{bmatrix} M_{xx} \\ M_{xy} \\M_{xz} \end{bmatrix}
:= \int_A \begin{bmatrix} y\sigma_{xz} - z\sigma_{xy} \\ z\sigma_{xx} \\ -y\sigma_{xx} \end{bmatrix}\,dA \,.$$

The internal moments are computed about an origin that is at the neutral axis of the beam or plate and the integration is through the thickness ($h$)

=== Example ===
Computing the bending moment in a beam.

In the beam shown in the adjacent figure, the external forces are the applied force at point A ($-F\mathbf{e}_y$) and the reactions at the two support points O and B ($\mathbf{R}_O = R_O\mathbf{e}_y$ and $\mathbf{R}_B = R_B\mathbf{e}_y$). For this situation, the only non-zero component of the bending moment is

$$\mathbf{M}_{xz} = -\left[\int_z\left[\int_0^h y\,\sigma_{xx}\,dy\right]\,dz\right]\mathbf{e}_z \,.$$

where $h$ is the height in the $y$ direction of the beam. The minus sign is included to satisfy the sign convention.

In order to calculate $\mathbf{M}_{xz}$, we begin by balancing the forces, which gives one equation with the two unknown reactions,

$$R_O + R_B - F = 0 \,.$$

To obtain each reaction a second equation is required. Balancing the moments about any arbitrary point X would give us a second equation we can use to solve for $R_0$ and $R_B$ in terms of $F$. Balancing about the point O is simplest but let's balance about point A just to illustrate the point, i.e.

$$-\mathbf{r}_A\times\mathbf{R}_O + (\mathbf{r}_B-\mathbf{r}_A)\times\mathbf{R}_B = \mathbf{0} \,.$$

If $L$ is the length of the beam, we have

$$\mathbf{r}_A = x_A\mathbf{e}_x \quad \text{and} \quad \mathbf{r}_B = L\mathbf{e}_x \,.$$

Evaluating the cross-products:

$$\left|\begin{matrix}\mathbf{e}_x & \mathbf{e}_y & \mathbf{e}_z \\ -x_A & 0 & 0 \\ 0 & R_0 & 0 \end{matrix}\right| +
\left|\begin{matrix}\mathbf{e}_x & \mathbf{e}_y & \mathbf{e}_z \\ L-x_A & 0 & 0 \\ 0 & R_B & 0 \end{matrix}\right|
= -x_AR_0\,\mathbf{e}_z +(L-x_A)R_B\,\mathbf{e}_z = 0 \,.$$

If we solve for the reactions we have

$$R_O = \left(1 - \frac{x_A}{L}\right) F \quad \text{and} \quad R_B = \frac{x_A}{L}\,F \,.$$

Now to obtain the internal bending moment at X we sum all the moments about the point X due to all the external forces to the right of X (on the positive $x$ side), and there is only one contribution in this case,

$$\mathbf{M}_{xz}= (\mathbf{r}_B-\mathbf{r}_X)\times\mathbf{R}_B
= \left|\begin{matrix}\mathbf{e}_x & \mathbf{e}_y & \mathbf{e}_z \\ L - x & 0 & 0 \\ 0 & R_B & 0 \end{matrix}\right|
= \frac{F x_A}{L}(L-x)\,\mathbf{e}_z \,.$$

We can check this answer by looking at the free body diagram and the part of the beam to the left of point X, and the total moment due to these external forces is

$$\mathbf{M} = (\mathbf{r}_A-\mathbf{r}_X)\times\mathbf{F} + (-\mathbf{r}_X)\times\mathbf{R}_O =
\left[(x_A-x)\mathbf{e}_x\right]\times\left(-F\mathbf{e}_y\right)
+ \left(-x\mathbf{e}_x\right)\times\left(R_O\mathbf{e}_y\right) \,.$$

If we compute the cross products, we have

$$\mathbf{M}
= \left|\begin{matrix}\mathbf{e}_x & \mathbf{e}_y & \mathbf{e}_z \\ x_A - x & 0 & 0 \\ 0 & -F & 0 \end{matrix}\right| +
\left|\begin{matrix}\mathbf{e}_x & \mathbf{e}_y & \mathbf{e}_z \\ -x & 0 & 0 \\ 0 & R_0 & 0 \end{matrix}\right|
= F(x-x_A)\,\mathbf{e}_z -R_0x\,\mathbf{e}_z = -\frac{F x_A}{L}(L-x)\,\mathbf{e}_z \,.$$

Thanks to the equilibrium, the internal bending moment due to external forces to the left of X must be exactly balanced by the internal turning force obtained by considering the part of the beam to the right of X

$$\mathbf{M} + \mathbf{M}_{xz} = \mathbf{0}   \,.$$

which is clearly the case.

=== Sign convention ===
In the above discussion, it is implicitly assumed that the bending moment is positive when the top of the beam is compressed. That can be seen if we consider a linear distribution of stress in the beam and find the resulting bending moment. Let the top of the beam be in compression with a stress $-h\sigma_0/2$ and let the bottom of the beam have a stress $h\sigma_0/2$. Then the stress distribution in the beam is $\sigma_{xx}(y) = -y\sigma_0$. The bending moment due to these stresses is

$$M_{xz} = -\left[\int_z\int_{-h/2}^{h/2} y\,(-y\sigma_0)\,dy\,dz\right] = \sigma_0\,I$$

where $I$ is the area moment of inertia of the cross-section of the beam. Therefore, the bending moment is positive when the top of the beam is in compression.

Many authors follow a different convention in which the stress resultant $M_{xz}$ is defined as

$$\mathbf{M}_{xz} = \left[\int_z\int_{-h/2}^{h/2} y\,\sigma_{xx}\,dy\,dz\right]\mathbf{e}_z \,.$$

In that case, positive bending moments imply that the top of the beam is in tension. Of course, the definition of top depends on the coordinate system being used. In the examples above, the top is the location with the largest $y$-coordinate.

== See also ==
- Buckling
- Deflection including deflection of a beam
- Twisting moment
- Shear and moment diagrams
- Stress resultants
- First moment of area
- Influence line
- Second moment of area
- List of area moments of inertia
- Wing bending relief
