= Heinrich Müller-Breslau =

German engineer (1851–1925)

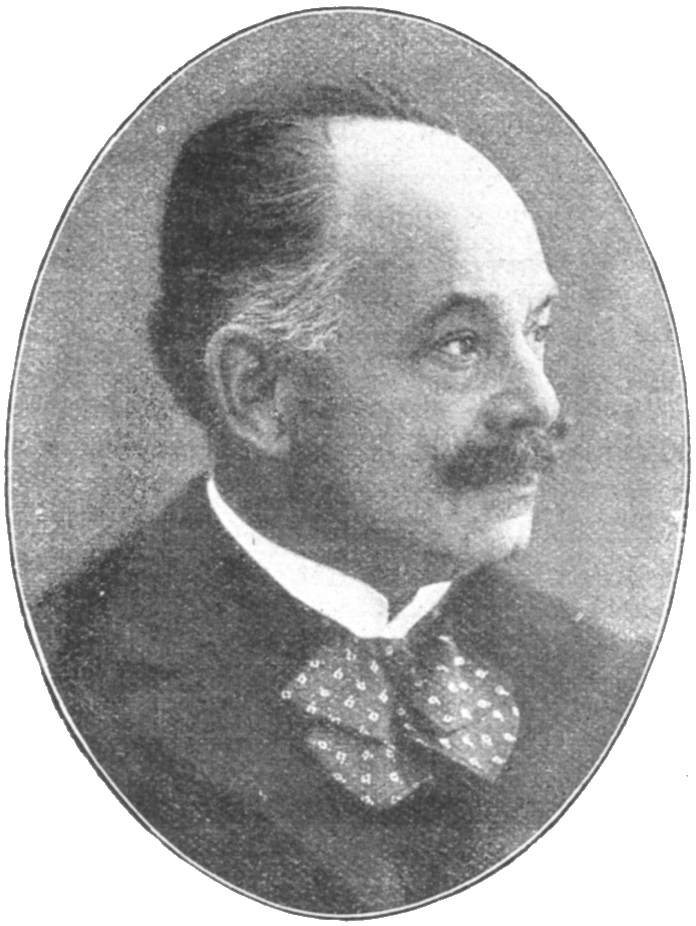
Heinrich Mueller-Breslau

Heinrich Franz Bernhard Müller (May 13, 1851 in Breslau – April 24, 1925 in Grunewald, Berlin, known as Müller-Breslau from around 1875 to distinguish him from other people with similar names) was a German civil engineer and high school teacher. He provided significant contributions to the theory of beams and frames in structural analysis.

Müller-Breslau was both a practicing engineer and theoretical researcher during his lifetime. He brought the previously separate elements of classical structural analysis together in a unified theory of beams and frames. He systematized the computational methods, in particular the principle of virtual displacements, and applied the energy sets systematically. He also calculated structures of airships.

After finishing school in 1869, he fought in the Franco-Prussian War, after which he began to study at the Berlin Trade Academy in 1871. He also attended lectures in mathematics taught by Elwin Bruno Christoffel and Karl Weierstrass at Berlin University. As a student he helped fellow students of the School of Architecture with their revision of structural analysis and prepared them for the second state examination. Based on this teaching he compiled his first textbook Elementares Handbuch der Festigkeitslehre (Elementary handbook of the strength of materials) in 1875. Two years later he wrote contributions on elasticity and strength as well as structural mechanics for Hütte - Des Ingenieurs Tachenbuch (Hütte's engineer's handbook).

== See also ==
Müller-Breslau's principle
