= Moment-area theorem =

The moment-area theorem is an engineering tool to derive the slope, rotation and deflection of beams and frames. This theorem was developed by Mohr and later stated namely by Charles Ezra Greene in 1873. This method is advantageous when we solve problems involving beams, especially for those subjected to a series of concentrated loadings or having segments with different moments of inertia.

== Theorem 1 ==
The change in slope between any two points on the elastic curve equals the area of the M/EI (moment) diagram between these two points.

$$\theta_{B/A}={\int_A}^B\left(\frac{M}{EI}\right)dx$$

where,

- $M$ = moment
- $EI$ = flexural rigidity
- $\theta_{A/B}$ = change in slope between points A and B
- $A, B$ = points on the elastic curve

== Theorem 2 ==
The vertical deviation of a point A on an elastic curve with respect to the tangent which is extended from another point B equals the moment of the area under the M/EI diagram between those two points (A and B). This moment is computed about point A where the deviation from B to A is to be determined.

$$t_{B/A} = {\int_A}^B \frac{M(x)}{E(x)I(x)} x \;dx$$

where,

- $M(x)$ = moment
- $E(x)I(x)$ = flexural rigidity (often constant, so written as: $EI$)
- $t_{A/B}$ = deviation of tangent at point A with respect to the tangent at point B
- $A, B$ = points on the elastic curve

== Rule of sign convention ==
The deviation at any point on the elastic curve is positive if the point lies above the tangent, negative if the point is below the tangent; we measured it from left tangent, if θ is counterclockwise direction, the change in slope is positive, negative if θ is clockwise direction.

== Procedure for analysis ==
The following procedure provides a method that may be used to determine the displacement and slope at a point on the elastic curve of a beam using the moment-area theorem.

- Determine the reaction forces of a structure and draw the M/EI diagram of the structure.
- If there are only concentrated loads on the structure, the problem will be easy to draw M/EI diagram which will results a series of triangular shapes.
- If there are mixed with distributed loads and concentrated, the moment diagram (M/EI) will results parabolic curves, cubic, etc.
- Then, assume and draw the deflection shape of the structure by looking at M/EI diagram.
- Find the rotations, change of slopes and deflections of the structure by using the geometric mathematics.
