= GBT =

GBT may refer to:

== Transport ==
- Gambat railway station, in Pakistan
- Gorgan Airport, in Iran
- Gotthard Base Tunnel, in Switzerland
- Greater Bridgeport Transit Authority, in Connecticut

== Other uses ==
- Gelora Bung Tomo Stadium, in Surabaya, Indonesia
- Generalised beam theory, in structural engineering
- Global Bio-Chem, a Hong Kong biotechnology company
- Amex GBT, a multinational travel management company
- Government and binding theory, in linguistics
- Green Bank Telescope, in West Virginia
- G-TELP Business Test, English language test
- Gwinnett Ballet Theatre, in Lawrenceville, Georgia, United States
