= Unified framework =

Unified framework is a general formulation which yields n^{th} - order expressions giving mode shapes and natural frequencies for damaged elastic structures such as rods, beams, plates, and shells. The formulation is applicable to structures with any shape of damage or those having more than one area of damage. The formulation uses the geometric definition of the discontinuity at the damage location and perturbation to modes and natural frequencies of the undamaged structure to determine the mode shapes and natural frequencies of the damaged structure. The geometric discontinuity at the damage location manifests itself in terms of discontinuities in the cross-sectional properties, such as the depth of the structure, the cross-sectional area or the area moment of inertia. The change in cross-sectional properties in turn affects the stiffness and mass distribution. Considering the geometric discontinuity along with the perturbation of modes and natural frequencies, the initial homogeneous differential equation with nonconstant coefficients is changed to a series of non-homogeneous differential equations with constant coefficients. Solutions of this series of differential equations is obtained in this framework.

This framework is about using structural-dynamics based methods to address the existing challenges in the field of structural health monitoring (SHM). It makes no ad hoc assumptions regarding the physical behavior at the damage location such as adding fictitious springs or modeling changes in Young's modulus.

== Introduction ==
Structural health monitoring (SHM) is a rapidly expanding field both in academia and research. Most of the literature on SHM is based on experimental observations and physically expected models. There are some mathematical models that give analytical theory to model the damage. Such mathematical models for structures with damage are useful in two ways. They allow understanding of the physics behind the problem, which helps in the explanation of experimental readings, and they allow prediction of response of the structure. These studies are also useful for the development of new experimental techniques.

Examples of models based on expected physical behavior of damage are by Ismail et al. (1990), who modeled the rectangular edge defect as a spring, by Ostachowicz and Krawczuk (1991), who modeled the damage as an elastic hinge and by Thompson (1949), who modeled the damage as a concentrated couple at the location of the damage. Other models based on expected physical behavior are by Joshi and Madhusudhan (1991), who modeled the damage as a zone with reduced Young's modulus and by Ballo (1999), who modeled it as spring with nonlinear stiffness. Krawczuk (2002) used an extensional spring at the damage location, with its flexibility determined using the stress intensity factors K_{I}. Approximate methods to model the crack are by Chondros et al. (1998), who used a so-called crack function as an additional term in the axial displacement of Euler–Bernoulli beams. The crack functions were determined using stress intensity factors K_{I}, K_{II} and K_{III}. Christides and Barr (1984) used the Rayleigh–Ritz method, Shen and Pierre (1990) used the Galerkin Method, and Qian et al. (1991) used a finite element method to predict the behavior of a beam with an edge crack. Law and Lu (2005) used assumed modes and modeled the crack mathematically as a Dirac delta function. Wang and Qiao (2007) approximated the modal displacements using Heaviside's function, which meant that modal displacements were discontinuous at the crack location.

=== Application to SHM ===
Primary shortcomings of the above methods were that:

1. They have been developed mostly for Euler–Bernoulli beam theory;
2. They were developed in a few cases for Timoshenko beam theory or plate theories with expressions provided only for particular boundary conditions and beam or plate shapes;
3. They did not include mass change when applicable; and
4. Only few damage shapes were considered, such as V-shaped or rectangular notches, even though damage can occur in a wide variety of shapes (for which stress intensity factors may not be readily available).

Observations in the literature survey regarding the different damage models are similar, i.e., they are not generic. In spite of considerable progress in the damage identification using vibration based methods, there is still lack of a fairly successful algorithm to detect damage as concluded in all the reviews since 1995. In 1995, in the review published by Dimarogonas (1996), it is concluded “A consistent cracked beam vibration theory is yet to be developed”. In 2005, in another review about vibration based structural health monitoring, Carden and Fanning (2004) conclude, “There is no universal agreement as to the optimum method for using measured vibration data for damage detection, location or quantification”. Similarly in 2007, Montalvao et al. (2006) state as one of the conclusions, “There is no general algorithm that allows the resolution of all kinds of problems in all kinds of structures”. Similar trends regarding lack of generality of proposed models is seen in the latest review by Fan and Qiao (2010).

The lack of generality of damage models is addressed by proposing a ‘unified framework’ which is valid for self-adjoint systems using beam theories like Euler–Bernoulli beam theory, Timoshenko, plate theories like Kirchhoff and Mindlin and shell theories. The model was presented and verified for a damaged beam with notch type damage, using first-order perturbation only, for the Euler–Bernoulli beam theory in the paper by Dixit and Hanagud (2011) and using Timoshenko beam theory in the paper by Dixit and Hanagud (2009). Since the results are given for nth order, a computer program can be developed which will give the results for mode shapes and natural frequencies to the desired accuracy, preempting the need to go through the mathematically arduous task of deriving the higher order expressions algebraically.

== Features ==
This Unified Framework involves a general analytical procedure, which yields nth-order expressions governing mode shapes and natural frequencies and for damaged elastic structures such as rods, beams, plates and shells of any shape. Features of the procedure include the following:

1. Rather than modeling the damage as a fictitious elastic element or localized or global change in constitutive properties, it is modeled in a mathematically rigorous manner as a geometric discontinuity.
2. The inertia effect (kinetic energy), which, unlike the stiffness effect (strain energy), of the damage has been neglected by researchers, is included in it.
3. The framework is generic and is applicable to wide variety of engineering structures of different shapes with arbitrary boundary conditions which constitute self adjoint systems and also to a wide variety of damage profiles and even multiple areas of damage.
