= Fixed end moment =

The fixed end moments are reaction moments developed in a beam member under certain load conditions with both ends fixed. A beam with both ends fixed is statically indeterminate to the 3rd degree, and any structural analysis method applicable on statically indeterminate beams can be used to calculate the fixed end moments.

== Examples ==
In the following examples, clockwise moments are positive.

Concentrated load of magnitude P	Linearly distributed load of maximum intensity q_{0}
Uniformly distributed load of intensity q	Couple of magnitude M_{0}

The two cases with distributed loads can be derived from the case with concentrated load by integration. For example, when a uniformly distributed load of intensity $q$ is acting on a beam, then an infinitely small part $dx$ distance $x$ apart from the left end of this beam can be seen as being under a concentrated load of magnitude $qdx$. Then,

$$M_{\mathrm{right}}^{\mathrm{fixed}} = \int_{0}^{L} \frac{q dx \, x^2 (L-x)}{L^2} = \frac{q L^2}{12}$$
$$M_{\mathrm{left}}^{\mathrm{fixed}} = \int_{0}^{L} \left \{ - \frac{q dx \, x^2 (L-x) }{L^2} \right \}= - \frac{q L^2}{12}$$

Where the expressions within the integrals on the right hand sides are the fixed end moments caused by the concentrated load $qdx$.

For the case with linearly distributed load of maximum intensity $q_0$,

$$M_{\mathrm{right}}^{\mathrm{fixed}} = \int_{0}^{L} q_0 \frac{x}{L} dx \frac{ x^2 (L-x)}{L^2} = \frac{q_0 L^2}{20}$$
$$M_{\mathrm{left}}^{\mathrm{fixed}} = \int_{0}^{L} \left \{ - q_0 \frac{x}{L} dx \frac{x (L-x)^2}{L^2} \right \} = - \frac{q_0 L^2}{30}$$

== See also ==
- Moment distribution method
- Statically Indeterminate
- Slope deflection method
- Matrix method
