= Sweetener (disambiguation) =

A sweetener is a substance added to food or sweetened beverage to impart the flavor of sweetness.

Sweetener may also refer to:

- Sweetener (album), by Ariana Grande (2018)
  - "Sweetener" (song), title track of the album

== See also ==
- Global Sweeteners, a Hong Kong food company
- Sweetener World Tour, by Ariana Grande (2019)
- The Sweetener Sessions, a tour by Ariana Grande (2018)
