= Stephen Timoshenko =

Ukrainian engineer and academic (1878–1972)

- Степан Тимошенко
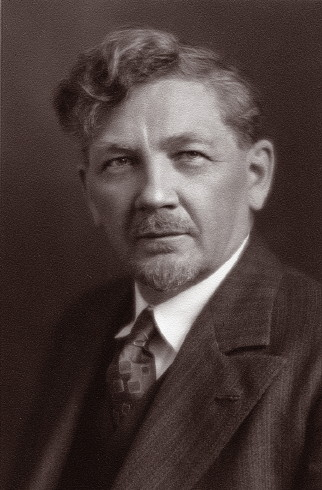
- Timoshenko, c. 1918
- Born: Stepan Prokopovych Tymoshenko; 22 December [O.S. 10 December] 1878; Shpotovka, Chernigov Governorate, Russian Empire
- Died: May 29, 1972 (aged 93); Wuppertal, West Germany
- Education: Petersburg State Transport University
- Known for: Timoshenko beam theory
- Awards: Louis E. Levy Medal (1944); Timoshenko Medal (1957); Elliott Cresson Medal (1958); Fellow of the Royal Society
- Scientific career
- Fields: Engineering Mechanics
- Workplaces: Kiev Polytechnic Institute, Peter the Great St. Petersburg Polytechnic University, University of Michigan, Stanford University
- Doctoral students: Nicholas J. Hoff; James N. Goodier; Egor Popov

Stepan Prokopovich Timoshenko (Ukrainian: Степан Прокопович Тимошенко, romanized: Stepan Prokopovych Tymoshenko, Ukrainian pronunciation: [steˈpɑn proˈkɔpowɪt͡ʃ tɪmoˈʃɛnko]; Russian: Степан Прокофьевич Тимошенко, romanized: Stepan Prokofyevich Timoshenko, [sʲtʲɪˈpan prɐˈkofʲjɪvʲɪtɕ tʲɪmɐˈʂɛnkə]; 22 December [O.S. 10 December] 1878 – May 29, 1972), later known as Stephen Timoshenko, was a Ukrainian and later an American engineer and academician.

He is considered to be the father of modern engineering mechanics. An inventor and one of the pioneering mechanical engineers at the St. Petersburg Polytechnic University. A founding member of the Ukrainian Academy of Sciences, Timoshenko wrote seminal works in the areas of engineering mechanics, elasticity and strength of materials, many of which are still widely used today. Having started his scientific career in the Russian Empire, Timoshenko emigrated to the Kingdom of Serbs, Croats and Slovenes during the Russian Civil War and then to the United States.

== Biography ==
Timoshenko was born in the village of Shpotovka, Uyezd of Konotop in the Chernigov Governorate which at that time was a territory of the Russian Empire (today in Konotop Raion, Sumy Oblast of Ukraine). He was ethnically Ukrainian.

He studied at a Realschule (Russian: реальное училище) in Romny, Poltava Governorate (now in Sumy Oblast) from 1889 to 1896. In Romny his schoolmate and friend was future famous semiconductor physicist Abram Ioffe. Timoshenko continued his education towards a university degree at the St. Petersburg State Transport University. After graduating in 1901, he stayed on teaching in this same institution from 1901 to 1903 and then worked at the Saint Petersburg Polytechnical Institute under Viktor Kirpichov 1903–1906. In 1905, he was sent for one year to the University of Göttingen where he worked under Ludwig Prandtl.

In the fall of 1906, he was appointed to the Chair of Strengths of Materials at the Kyiv Polytechnic Institute. The return to his native Ukraine turned out to be an important part of his career and also influenced his future personal life. From 1907 to 1911, as a professor at the Polytechnic Institute he did research in the earlier variant of the Finite Element Method of elastic calculations, the so-called Rayleigh method. During those years he also pioneered work on buckling, and published the first version of his famous Strength of Materials textbook. He was elected dean of the Division of Structural Engineering in 1909.

In 1911 he signed a protest against Minister for Education Kasso and was fired from the Kyiv Polytechnic Institute. In 1911 he was awarded the D. I. Zhuravski prize of the St. Petersburg State Transport University that helped him survive after losing his job. He went to St Petersburg where he worked as a lecturer and then a Professor in the Electrotechnical Institute and the St Petersburg Institute of the Railways (1911–1917). During that time he developed the theory of elasticity and the theory of beam deflection, and continued to study buckling. In 1918 he returned to Kyiv and assisted Vladimir Vernadsky in establishing the Ukrainian Academy of Sciences – the oldest academy among the Soviet republics other than Russia. In 1918–1920 Timoshenko headed the newly established Institute of Mechanics of the Ukrainian Academy of Sciences, which today carries his name.

After the Armed Forces of South Russia of general Denikin had taken Kyiv in 1919, Timoshenko moved from Kyiv to Rostov-on-Don. After travel via Novorossiysk, Crimea and Constantinople to the Kingdom of Serbs, Croats and Slovenes, he arrived in Zagreb, where he got professorship at the Zagreb Polytechnic Institute. In 1920, during the brief liberation of Kyiv from Bolsheviks, Timoshenko traveled to the city, reunited with his family and returned with his family to Zagreb.

He is remembered for delivering lectures in Russian while using as many words in Croatian as he could; the students were able to understand him well.

=== United States ===
In 1922, Timoshenko moved to the United States where he worked for the Westinghouse Electric Corporation from 1923 to 1927, after which he became a faculty professor in the University of Michigan where he created the first bachelor's and doctoral programs in engineering mechanics. His textbooks have been published in 36 languages. His first textbooks and papers were written in Russian; later in his life, he published mostly in English. In 1928 he was an Invited Speaker of the ICM in Bologna. From 1936 onward he was a professor at Stanford University. He was elected to the American Philosophical Society in 1939 and the United States National Academy of Sciences in 1940.

Timoshenko's younger brothers, architect Serhii (Sergius Timoshenko, Ukrainian Minister of Transport, participant in the 1921 Second Winter Campaign against the Soviet regime, and member of the Polish Senate), and economist Volodymyr, both immigrated to the United States as well.

In 1957, ASME established a medal named after Stephen Timoshenko; he became its first recipient. The Timoshenko Medal honors Stephen P. Timoshenko as the world-renowned authority in the field of mechanical engineering and it commemorates his contributions as author and teacher. The Timoshenko Medal is given annually for distinguished contributions in applied mechanics. In 1960 he moved to Wuppertal, West Germany to be with his daughter.

In addition to his textbooks, in 1963 Timoshenko wrote a book Engineering Education in Russia and an autobiography, As I Remember in the Russian language. It was translated into English in 1968 by sponsorship of Stanford University. Jacob Pieter Den Hartog, who was Timoshenko's co-worker in the early 1920s at Westinghouse, wrote a review in the magazine Science stating that "between 1922 and 1962 he [S.P. Timoshenko] wrote a dozen books on all aspects of engineering mechanics, which are in their third or fourth U.S. edition and which have been translated into half a dozen foreign languages each, so that his name as an author and scholar is known to nearly every mechanical and civil engineer in the entire world.. Then, Den Hartog stressed: "There is no question that Timoshenko did much for America. It is an equally obvious truth that America did much for Timoshenko, as it did for millions of other immigrants for all over the world. However, our autobiographer has never admitted as much to his associates and pupils who, like myself often have been pained by his casual statements in conversation. That pain is not diminished by reading these statements on the printed page and one would have wished for a little less acid and a little more human kindness."

The celebrated theory that takes into account shear deformation and rotary inertia was developed by Timoshenko in collaboration with Paul Ehrenfest. Thus it is referred to as Timoshenko-Ehrenfest beam theory. This fact was testified by Timoshenko. The interrelation between Timoshenko-Ehrenfest beam and Euler-Bernoulli beam theory was investigated in the book by Wang, Reddy and Lee.

He died in 1972 and his ashes are buried in Alta Mesa Memorial Park, Palo Alto, California.

Eduard Ivanovich Grigolyuk (1923—2005) wrote several papers devoted to S.P. Timoshenko’s life and work. He also composed two books about him. Elishakoff et al. wrote several articles investigating S.P. Timoshenko’s scientific activities and the question of the priority.

An archive of his manuscripts, letters, and handwritten materials are available online.

=== List of doctoral students in the U.S. ===
Timoshenko remembered his students in his autobiography:

University of Michigan

- Coates, W. M., (1929)
- Donnell, L. H., (1930)
- Billevicz, V., (1931)
- Everett, F. L., (1931)
- Frocht, M. M., (1931)
- Goodier, J. N., (1931)
- Brandeberry, J. B., (1932)
- MacCullough, G. H., (1932)
- Jamieson, J., (1933)
- Taylor, W. H., (1933)
- Verse, G. L., (1933)
- Vesselowsky, S. T., (1933)
- Weibel, E. E., (1933)
- Jakkula, A. A., (1934)
- Maugh, L. C., (1934)
- Schoonover, R. H., (1934)
- Way, S., (1934)
- Wojtaszak, I. A., (1934)
- Allan, G. W. C., (1935)
- Horger, O. J., (1935)
- Maulbetsch, J. L., (1935)
- Miles, A. J., (1935)
- Young, D. H., (1935)
- Anderson, C. G., (1936)
- Fox, E. N., (1936)
- Hetenyi, M. I., (1936)
- Hogan, M. B., (1936)
- Marin, J., (1936)
- Zahorski, A. T., (1937)

Stanford University

- Bergman, E. O., (1938)
- Kurzweil, A. C., (1940)
- Lee, E. H., (1940)
- Huang, Y. S., (1941)
- Wang, T. K., (1941)
- Weber, H. S., (1941)
- Hoff, N. J., (1942)
- Popov, E. P., (1946)
- Chilton, E. G., (1947)

== Publications ==
- Applied Elasticity, with J. M. Lessells, D. Van Nostrand Company, 1925
- Vibration Problems in Engineering, D. Van Nostrand Company, 1st Ed. 1928, 2nd Ed. 1937, 3rd Ed. 1955 (with D. H. Young)
- Strength of Materials, Part I, Elementary Theory and Problems, D. Van Nostrand Company, 1st Ed. 1930, 2nd Ed. 1940, 3rd Ed. 1955
- Strength of Materials, Part II, Advanced Theory and Problems, D. Van Nostrand Company, 1st Ed. 1930, 2nd Ed. 1941, 3rd Ed. 1956
- Theory of Elasticity , McGraw-Hill Book Company, 1st Ed. 1934, 2nd Ed. 1951 (with J. N. Goodier), 3rd Ed. 1970 (with J.N. Goodier)
- Elements of Strength of Materials, D. Van Nostrand Co., 1st Ed. 1935, 2nd Ed. 1940, 3rd Ed. 1949 (with G.H. MacCullough), 4th Ed. 1962 (with D.H. Young)
- Theory of Elastic Stability, McGraw-Hill Book Company, 1st Ed. 1936, 2nd Ed. 1961 (with J. M. Gere)
- Engineering Mechanics, with D.H. Young, McGraw-Hill Book Company, 1st Ed. 1937, 2nd Ed. 1940, 3rd. Ed. 1951, 4th Ed. 1956
- Theory of Plates and Shells , McGraw-Hill Book Company, 1st Ed. 1940, 2nd Ed. 1959 (with S. Woinowsky-Krieger)
- Theory of Structures, with D. H. Young, McGraw-Hill Book Company, 1st Ed. 1945, 2nd Ed. 1965
- Advanced Dynamics, with D. H. Young, McGraw-Hill Book Company, 1948
- History of The Strength of Materials, McGraw-Hill Book Company, 1953
- Engineering Education in Russia, McGraw-Hill Book Company, 1959
- As I Remember, D. Van Nostrand, 1968, ASIN: B000JOIJ7I
- Mechanics of Materials, with J. M. Gere, 1st edition, D. Van Nostrand Company, 1972
- Erinnerungen, Translation from the Russian original edition (Translator: Albert Duda), Berlin: Wiley, 2006, ISBN 3-433-01816-2 (in German)

== See also ==
- Timoshenko beam theory
