= James N. Goodier =

Applied mechanics professor (1905–1969)

- Born: 17 October 1905; Preston, Lancashire, England
- Died: 5 November 1969 (aged 64); Los Gatos, California
- Education: Cambridge University; University of Michigan
- Known for: Work in elasticity and plastic deformation.
- Awards: Timoshenko Medal; Fulbright Award Cambridge; Honorary degree University of Michigan; George Westinghouse Award (ASEE)
- Scientific career
- Fields: Engineering
- Doctoral advisors: Charles Inglis; Stephen Timoshenko

James Norman Goodier (October 17, 1905 – November 5, 1969) was professor of applied mechanics at Stanford University known for his work in elasticity and plastic deformation.

He was born in Preston, Lancashire, England and studied engineering at Cambridge University. He was awarded a Commonwealth Fund Fellowship which enabled him to continue his studies at the University of Michigan where he earned his doctorate in 1931 under the direction of Stephen Timoshenko with a dissertation titled Compression of Rectangular Blocks, and the Bending of Beams by Nonlinear Distributions of Bending Forces. Timoshenko moved to Stanford University in 1936 and Goodier eventually succeeded him there.

He was co-author of two classic books in this field: "Theory of Elasticity," with Timoshenko, 1951; and "Elasticity and Plasticity," with P. G. Hodge, Jr., 1958 and was awarded the Timoshenko Medal by the American Society of Mechanical Engineers in 1961. He was chairman of the Applied Mechanics Division of the American Society of Mechanical Engineers from 1945 to 1946, and was elected Fellow of that Society in 1964. He had more than fifty doctoral students, two of whom were George F. Carrier and Nils Otto Myklestad.
