= Euler–Bernoulli beam theory =

Method for load calculation in construction

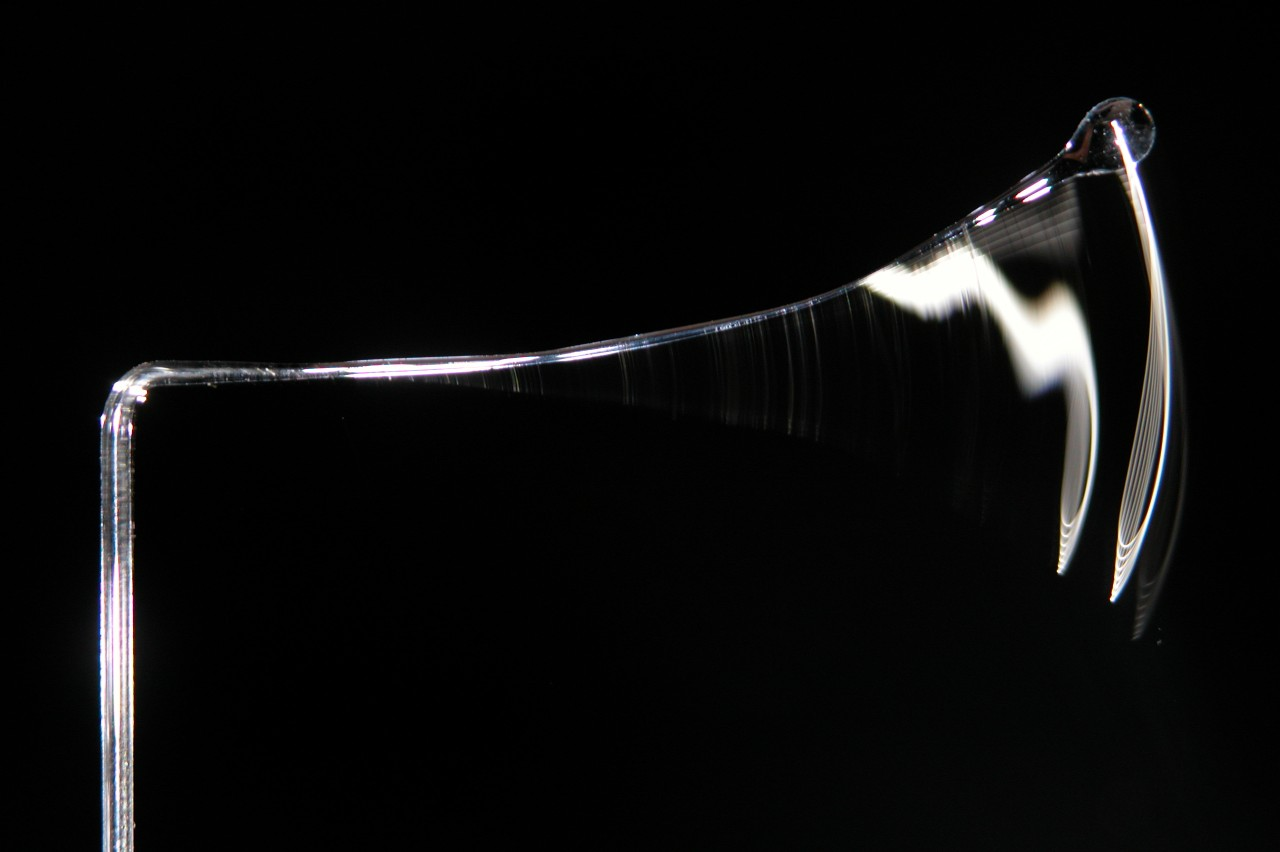
This vibrating glass beam may be modeled as a cantilever beam with acceleration, variable linear density, variable section modulus, some kind of dissipation, springy end loading, and possibly a point mass at the free end.

Euler–Bernoulli beam theory (also known as engineer's beam theory or classical beam theory) is a simplification of the linear theory of elasticity which provides a means of calculating the load-carrying capacity and deflection of beams.

When external forces are applied to a beam, internal shear forces and bending moments develop causing bending and curvature. Euler–Bernoulli beam theory states that the shear force at any point on a beam is the cumulative sum of the loads applied along the length of the beam up to that point. Similarly, the bending moment at any point is the sum of the shear forces along the beam up to that point. Additionally, the theory states that the deflection at any point on the beam is the fourth integral of the applied loads up to that point, and depends on flexural rigidity. Through the use of calculus, and boundary conditions describing the beam's curvature at its supports, the theory provides a mathematical model to predict the structural behavior of beams.

Euler–Bernoulli beam theory is limited to small deflections of a beam that is subjected to lateral loads only, causing elastic bending. Beam theories were later refined in the 20th century to account for the effects of shear deformation and rotatory inertia; Euler–Bernoulli beam theory is now considered a case of Timoshenko–Ehrenfest beam theory that neglects these effects.

It was first enunciated circa 1750, but was not applied on a large scale until the development of the Eiffel Tower and the Ferris wheel in the late 19th century. Following these successful demonstrations, it quickly became a cornerstone of engineering and an enabler of the Second Industrial Revolution.

Additional models have been developed, such as plate theory, but the simplicity of beam theory makes it an important tool in the sciences, especially structural and mechanical engineering.

== History ==
Schematic of cross-section of a bent beam showing the neutral axis.

Prevailing consensus is that Galileo Galilei made the first attempts at developing a theory of beams, but recent studies argue that Leonardo da Vinci was the first to make the crucial observations. Leonardo lacked Hooke's law and calculus to complete the theory, whereas Galileo was held back by an incorrect assumption he made.

Jacob Bernoulli postulated that the curvature at any point on a deflected beam is proportional to its bending moment at that point, first published in Histoire de l'Académie royale des sciences in 1705. He also formulated an approach for calculating the deflection of a cantilevered beam with a concentrated load at its free end, however he erroneously assumed a beam's curvature is due to its cross-section rotating about an axis that intersects the extreme compression fiber.

Leonhard Euler built on Jacob Bernoulli's work, and applied differential calculus to describe the behavior of elastic curves and published Methodus inveniendi lineas curvas in 1744.

Daniel Bernoulli furthered theories and formulated the differential equation of motion of a vibrating beam.

== Static beam equation ==
The Euler–Bernoulli equation describes the relationship between the beam's deflection and the applied load:

$\frac{\mathrm{d}^2}{\mathrm{d} x^2}\left(EI \frac{\mathrm{d}^2 w}{\mathrm{d} x^2}\right) = q\,$

The curve $w(x)$ describes the deflection of the beam in the $z$ direction at some position $x$ (recall that the beam is modeled as a one-dimensional object). $q$ is a distributed load, in other words a force per unit length (analogous to pressure being a force per area); it may be a function of $x$, $w$, or other variables. $E$ is the elastic modulus and $I$ is the second moment of area of the beam's cross section. $I$ must be calculated with respect to the axis which is perpendicular to the applied loading. (Note: For an Euler–Bernoulli beam not under any axial loading this axis is called the neutral axis.) Explicitly, for a beam whose axis is oriented along $x$ with a loading along $z$, the beam's cross section is in the $yz$ plane, and the relevant second moment of area is

$$I = \iint z^2\; dy\; dz,$$

It can be shown from equilibrium considerations that the centroid of the cross section must be at $y=z=0$.

Often, the product $EI$ (known as the flexural rigidity) is a constant, so that

$$EI \frac{\mathrm{d}^4 w}{\mathrm{d} x^4} = q(x).\,$$

This equation, describing the deflection of a uniform, static beam, is used widely in engineering practice. Tabulated expressions for the deflection $w$ for common beam configurations can be found in engineering handbooks. For more complicated situations, the deflection can be determined by solving the Euler–Bernoulli equation using techniques such as "direct integration", "Macaulay's method", "moment area method", "conjugate beam method", "the principle of virtual work", "Castigliano's method", "flexibility method", "slope deflection method", "moment distribution method", or "direct stiffness method".

Sign conventions are defined here since different conventions can be found in the literature. In this article, a right-handed coordinate system is used with the $x$ axis to the right, the $z$ axis pointing upwards, and the $y$ axis pointing into the figure. The sign of the bending moment $M$ is taken as positive when the torque vector associated with the bending moment on the right hand side of the section is in the positive $y$ direction, that is, a positive value of $M$ produces compressive stress at the bottom surface. With this choice of bending moment sign convention, in order to have $dM = Qdx$, it is necessary that the shear force $Q$ acting on the right side of the section be positive in the $z$ direction so as to achieve static equilibrium of moments. If the loading intensity $q$ is taken positive in the positive $z$ direction, then $dQ = -qdx$ is necessary for force equilibrium.

Successive derivatives of the deflection $w$ have important physical meanings: $dw/dx$ is the slope of the beam, which is the anti-clockwise angle of rotation about the $y$-axis in the limit of small displacements;

$$M = -EI \frac{d^2w}{dx^2}$$

is the bending moment in the beam; and

$$Q = -\frac{d}{d x}\left(EI\frac{d^2 w}{d x^2}\right)$$

is the shear force in the beam.

Bending of an Euler–Bernoulli beam. Each cross section of the beam is at 90 degrees to the neutral axis.

The stresses in a beam can be calculated from the above expressions after the deflection due to a given load has been determined.

=== Derivation of the bending equation ===
Because of the fundamental importance of the bending moment equation in engineering, we will provide a short derivation. We change to polar coordinates. The length of the neutral axis in the figure is $\rho d \theta.$ The length of a fiber with a radial distance $z$ below the neutral axis is $(\rho + z)d \theta.$ Therefore, the strain of this fiber is

$$\frac {\left(\rho + z - \rho \right ) \ d \theta} {\rho \ d \theta} = \frac {z} {\rho}.$$

The stress of this fiber is $E\dfrac {z}{\rho}$ where $E$ is the elastic modulus in accordance with Hooke's law. The differential force vector, $d\mathbf{F},$ resulting from this stress, is given by

$$d\mathbf{F} = E \frac{z}{\rho} dA \mathbf{e_x}.$$

This is the differential force vector exerted on the right hand side of the section shown in the figure. We know that it is in the $\mathbf{e_x}$ direction since the figure clearly shows that the fibers in the lower half are in tension. $dA$ is the differential element of area at the location of the fiber. The differential bending moment vector, $d\mathbf{M}$ associated with $d\mathbf{F}$ is given by

$$d\mathbf{M} = -z\mathbf{e_z} \times  d\mathbf{F} = -\mathbf{e_y} E \frac {z^2} {\rho} dA.$$

This expression is valid for the fibers in the lower half of the beam. The expression for the fibers in the upper half of the beam will be similar except that the moment arm vector will be in the positive $z$ direction and the force vector will be in the $-x$ direction since the upper fibers are in compression. But the resulting bending moment vector will still be in the $-y$ direction since $\mathbf{e_z} \times -\mathbf{e_x} = -\mathbf{e_y}.$ Therefore, we integrate over the entire cross section of the beam and get for $\mathbf{M}$ the bending moment vector exerted on the right cross section of the beam the expression

$$\mathbf{M} =\int d\mathbf{M} = -\mathbf{e_y} \frac {E} {\rho} \int{z^2} \ dA = -\mathbf{e_y} \frac {EI} {\rho},$$

where $I$ is the second moment of area. From calculus, we know that when $\dfrac{dw}{dx}$ is small, as it is for an Euler–Bernoulli beam, we can make the approximation $\dfrac{1}{\rho} \simeq \dfrac{d^2w}{dx^2}$, where $\rho$ is the radius of curvature. Therefore,

$$\mathbf{M} = -\mathbf{e_y} EI {d^2w \over dx^2}.$$

This vector equation can be separated in the bending unit vector definition ($M$ is oriented as $\mathbf{e_y}$), and in the bending equation:

$$M = - EI {d^2w \over dx^2}.$$

== Dynamic beam equation ==
Finite element method model of a vibration of a wide-flange beam (Ɪ-beam).

The dynamic beam equation is the Euler–Lagrange equation for the following action:

$$S = \int_{t_{1}}^{t_{2}}\int_0^L \left[ \frac{1}{2} \mu \left( \frac{\partial w}{\partial t} \right)^2 - \frac{1}{2} EI \left( \frac{ \partial^2 w}{\partial x^2} \right)^2 + q(x) w(x,t)\right] dx dt.$$

The first term represents the kinetic energy where $\mu$ is the mass per unit length, the second term represents the potential energy due to internal forces (when considered with a negative sign), and the third term represents the potential energy due to the external load $q(x)$. The Euler–Lagrange equation is used to determine the function that minimizes the functional $S$. For a dynamic Euler–Bernoulli beam, the Euler–Lagrange equation is

$\cfrac{\partial^2 }{\partial x^2}\left(EI\cfrac{\partial^2 w}{\partial x^2}\right) = - \mu\cfrac{\partial^2 w}{\partial t^2} + q(x).$

Derivation of Euler–Lagrange equation for beams
Since the Lagrangian is

$$\mathcal{L} := \tfrac{1}{2} \mu \left( \frac{\partial w}{\partial t} \right)^2 - \tfrac{1}{2} EI \left( \frac{ \partial^2 w}{\partial x^2} \right)^2 + q(x) w(x,t) = \tfrac{\mu}{2}\dot{w}^2 - \tfrac{EI}{2}w_{xx}^2 + qw \equiv \mathcal{L}(x, t, w, \dot{w}, w_{xx})$$

the corresponding Euler–Lagrange equation is

$$\cfrac{\partial\mathcal{L}}{\partial w} - \frac{\partial}{\partial t}\left(\frac{\partial \mathcal{L}}{\partial \dot{w}}\right)  + \frac{\partial^2}{\partial x^2}\left(\frac{\partial \mathcal{L}}{\partial w_{xx}}\right) = 0$$

Now,

$$\cfrac{\partial\mathcal{L}}{\partial w} = q ~;~~ \frac{\partial \mathcal{L}}{\partial \dot{w}} = \mu\dot{w}
~;~~ \frac{\partial \mathcal{L}}{\partial w_{xx}} = -EI w_{xx} ~.$$

Plugging into the Euler–Lagrange equation gives

$$q - \mu\ddot{w} - (EI w_{xx})_{xx} = 0$$

or,

$$\cfrac{\partial^2 }{\partial x^2}\left(EI\cfrac{\partial^2 w}{\partial x^2}\right) = - \mu\cfrac{\partial^2 w}{\partial t^2} + q$$

which is the governing equation for the dynamics of an Euler–Bernoulli beam.

When the beam is homogeneous, $E$ and $I$ are independent of $x$, and the beam equation is simpler:

$$EI\cfrac{\partial^4 w}{\partial x^4} = - \mu\cfrac{\partial^2 w}{\partial t^2} + q \,.$$

=== Free vibration ===
In the absence of a transverse load, $q$, we have the free vibration equation. This equation can be solved using a Fourier decomposition of the displacement into the sum of harmonic vibrations of the form

$$w(x,t) = \text{Re}[\hat{w}(x)~e^{-i\omega t}]$$

where $\omega$ is the frequency of vibration. Then, for each value of frequency, we can solve an ordinary differential equation

$$EI~\cfrac{\mathrm{d}^4 \hat{w}}{\mathrm{d}x^4} - \mu\omega^2\hat{w} = 0 \,.$$

The general solution of the above equation is

$$\hat{w} = A_1\cosh(\beta x) + A_2\sinh(\beta x) + A_3\cos(\beta x) + A_4\sin(\beta x) \quad \text{with} \quad \beta := \left(\frac{\mu\omega^2}{EI}\right)^{1/4}$$

where $A_1,A_2,A_3,A_4$ are constants. These constants are unique for a given set of boundary conditions. However, the solution for the displacement is not unique and depends on the frequency. These solutions are typically written as

$$\hat{w}_n = A_1\cosh(\beta_n x) + A_2\sinh(\beta_n x) + A_3\cos(\beta_n x) + A_4\sin(\beta_n x) \quad \text{with} \quad \beta_n := \left(\frac{\mu\omega_n^2}{EI}\right)^{1/4}\,.$$

The quantities $\omega_n$ are called the natural frequencies of the beam. Each of the displacement solutions is called a mode, and the shape of the displacement curve is called a mode shape.

==== Example: Cantilevered beam ====
Mode shapes for the first four modes of a vibrating cantilever beam.

The boundary conditions for a cantilevered beam of length $L$ (fixed at $x = 0$) are

$$\begin{align}
&\hat{w}_n = 0 ~,~~ \frac{d\hat{w}_n}{dx} = 0 \quad \text{at} ~~ x = 0 \\
&\frac{d^2\hat{w}_n}{dx^2} = 0 ~,~~ \frac{d^3\hat{w}_n}{dx^3} = 0 \quad \text{at} ~~ x = L \,.
\end{align}$$

If we apply these conditions, non-trivial solutions are found to exist only if $\cosh(\beta_n L)\,\cos(\beta_n L) + 1 = 0 \,.$ This nonlinear equation can be solved numerically. The first four roots are $\beta_1 L = 0.596864\pi$, $\beta_2 L = 1.49418\pi$, $\beta_3 L = 2.50025\pi$, and $\beta_4 L = 3.49999\pi$.

The corresponding natural frequencies of vibration are

$$\omega_1 = \beta_1^2 \sqrt{\frac{EI}{\mu}} = \frac{3.5160}{L^2}\sqrt{\frac{EI}{\mu}} ~,~~ \dots$$

The boundary conditions can also be used to determine the mode shapes from the solution for the displacement:

$$\hat{w}_n = A_1 \left[(\cosh\beta_n x - \cos\beta_n x) +
\frac{\cos\beta_n L + \cosh\beta_n L}{\sin\beta_n L + \sinh\beta_n L}(\sin\beta_n x - \sinh\beta_n x)\right]$$

Cantilevered beam excited near the resonant frequency of mode 2.

The unknown constant (actually constants as there is one for each $n$), $A_1$, which in general is complex, is determined by the initial conditions at $t = 0$ on the velocity and displacements of the beam. Typically a value of $A_1 = 1$ is used when plotting mode shapes. Solutions to the undamped forced problem have unbounded displacements when the driving frequency matches a natural frequency $\omega_n$, i.e., the beam can resonate. The natural frequencies of a beam therefore correspond to the frequencies at which resonance can occur.

==== Example: free–free (unsupported) beam ====
The first four modes of a vibrating free–free Euler-Bernoulli beam.

A free–free beam is a beam without any supports. The boundary conditions for a free–free beam of length $L$ extending from $x=0$ to $x=L$ are given by:

$$\frac{d^2\hat{w}_n}{dx^2} = 0 ~,~~ \frac{d^3\hat{w}_n}{dx^3} = 0 \quad \text{at} ~~ x=0 \,\text{and} \, x=L \,.$$

If we apply these conditions, non-trivial solutions are found to exist only if

$\cosh(\beta_n L)\,\cos(\beta_n L) - 1 = 0 \,.$

This nonlinear equation can be solved numerically. The first four roots are $\beta_1 L= 1.50562\pi$, $\beta_2 L = 2.49975\pi$, $\beta_3 L = 3.50001\pi$, and $\beta_4 L = 4.50000\pi$.

The corresponding natural frequencies of vibration are:

$$\omega_1 = \beta_1^2 \sqrt{\frac{EI}{\mu}} = \frac{22.3733}{L^2}\sqrt{\frac{EI}{\mu}} ~,~~ \dots$$

The boundary conditions can also be used to determine the mode shapes from the solution for the displacement:

$$\hat{w}_n = A_1 \Bigl[  (\cos\beta_n x + \cosh\beta_n x) -
\frac{\cos\beta_n L - \cosh\beta_n L}{\sin\beta_n L - \sinh\beta_n L}(\sin\beta_n x + \sinh\beta_n x)\Bigr]$$

As with the cantilevered beam, the unknown constants are determined by the initial conditions at $t = 0$ on the velocity and displacements of the beam. Also, solutions to the undamped forced problem have unbounded displacements when the driving frequency matches a natural frequency $\omega_n$.

==== Example: hinged-hinged beam ====
The boundary conditions of a hinged-hinged beam of length $L$ (fixed at $x = 0$ and $x = L$) are

$$\hat{w}_n = 0 ~,~~ \frac{d^2\hat{w}_n}{dx^2} = 0 \quad  \text{at} ~~ x=0 \,\text{and} \, x=L \,.$$

This implies solutions exist for $\sin(\beta_n L)\,\sinh(\beta_n L) = 0 \,.$ Setting $\beta_n = n\pi / L$ enforces this condition. Rearranging for natural frequency gives

$$\omega_n = \frac{n^2\pi^2}{L^2} \sqrt{\frac{EI}{\mu}}$$

== Stress ==
Besides deflection, the beam equation describes forces and moments and can thus be used to describe stresses. For this reason, the Euler–Bernoulli beam equation is widely used in engineering, especially civil and mechanical, to determine the strength (as well as deflection) of beams under bending.

Both the bending moment and the shear force cause stresses in the beam. The stress due to shear force is maximum along the neutral axis of the beam (when the width of the beam, t, is constant along the cross section of the beam; otherwise an integral involving the first moment and the beam's width needs to be evaluated for the particular cross section), and the maximum tensile stress is at either the top or bottom surfaces. Thus the maximum principal stress in the beam may be neither at the surface nor at the center but in some general area. However, shear force stresses are negligible in comparison to bending moment stresses in all but the stockiest of beams as well as the fact that stress concentrations commonly occur at surfaces, meaning that the maximum stress in a beam is likely to be at the surface.

=== Simple or symmetrical bending ===
Element of a bent beam: the fibers form concentric arcs, the top fibers are compressed and bottom fibers stretched.

For beam cross-sections that are symmetrical about a plane perpendicular to the neutral plane, it can be shown that the tensile stress experienced by the beam may be expressed as:

$$\sigma = \frac{Mz}{I} = -zE ~ \frac{\mathrm{d}^2 w}{\mathrm{d} x^2}.\,$$

Here, $z$ is the distance from the neutral axis to a point of interest; and $M$ is the bending moment. Note that this equation implies that pure bending (of positive sign) will cause zero stress at the neutral axis, positive (tensile) stress at the "top" of the beam, and negative (compressive) stress at the bottom of the beam; and also implies that the maximum stress will be at the top surface and the minimum at the bottom. This bending stress may be superimposed with axially applied stresses, which will cause a shift in the neutral (zero stress) axis.

=== Maximum stresses at a cross-section ===
Quantities used in the definition of the section modulus of a beam.

The maximum tensile stress at a cross-section is at the location $z = c_1$ and the maximum compressive stress is at the location $z = -c_2$ where the height of the cross-section is $h = c_1 + c_2$. These stresses are

$$\sigma_1 = \cfrac{Mc_1}{I} = \cfrac{M}{S_1} ~;~~ \sigma_2 = -\cfrac{Mc_2}{I} = -\cfrac{M}{S_2}$$

The quantities $S_1,S_2$ are the section moduli and are defined as

$$S_1 = \cfrac{I}{c_1} ~;~~ S_2 = \cfrac{I}{c_2}$$

The section modulus combines all the important geometric information about a beam's section into one quantity. For the case where a beam is doubly symmetric, $c_1 = c_2$ and we have one section modulus $S = I/c$.

=== Strain in an Euler–Bernoulli beam ===
We need an expression for the strain in terms of the deflection of the neutral surface to relate the stresses in an Euler–Bernoulli beam to the deflection. To obtain that expression we use the assumption that normals to the neutral surface remain normal during the deformation and that deflections are small. These assumptions imply that the beam bends into an arc of a circle of radius $\rho$ (see Figure 1) and that the neutral surface does not change in length during the deformation.

Let $\mathrm{d}x$ be the length of an element of the neutral surface in the undeformed state. For small deflections, the element does not change its length after bending but deforms into an arc of a circle of radius $\rho$. If $\mathrm{d}\theta$ is the angle subtended by this arc, then $\mathrm{d}x = \rho~\mathrm{d}\theta$.

Let us now consider another segment of the element at a distance $z$ above the neutral surface. The initial length of this element is $\mathrm{d}x$. However, after bending, the length of the element becomes $\mathrm{d}x' = (\rho-z)~\mathrm{d}\theta = \mathrm{d}x - z~\mathrm{d}\theta$. The strain in that segment of the beam is given by

$$\varepsilon_x = \cfrac{\mathrm{d}x'-\mathrm{d}x}{\mathrm{d}x} = -\cfrac{z}{\rho} = -\kappa~z$$

where $\kappa$ is the curvature of the beam. This gives us the axial strain in the beam as a function of distance from the neutral surface. However, we still need to find a relation between the radius of curvature and the beam deflection $w$.

=== Relation between curvature and beam deflection ===
Let P be a point on the neutral surface of the beam at a distance $x$ from the origin of the $(x,z)$ coordinate system. The slope of the beam is approximately equal to the angle made by the neutral surface with the $x$-axis for the small angles encountered in beam theory. Therefore, with this approximation,

$$\theta(x) = \cfrac{\mathrm{d}w}{\mathrm{d}x}$$

Therefore, for an infinitesimal element $\mathrm{d}x$, the relation $\mathrm{d}x = \rho~\mathrm{d}\theta$ can be written as

$$\cfrac{1}{\rho} = \cfrac{\mathrm{d}\theta}{\mathrm{d}x} = \cfrac{\mathrm{d}^2w}{\mathrm{d}x^2} = \kappa$$

Standard deflection behaviour for simply supported beams under uniformly distributed loads can be visualized using well-known shear and moment diagrams and closed-form elastic equations.

Hence the strain in the beam may be expressed as

$$\varepsilon_{x} = -z\kappa$$

=== Stress-strain relations ===
For a homogeneous isotropic linear elastic material, the stress is related to the strain by $\sigma = E\varepsilon$, where $E$ is the Young's modulus. Hence the stress in an Euler–Bernoulli beam is given by

$$\sigma_x = -zE\cfrac{\mathrm{d}^2w}{\mathrm{d}x^2}$$

Note that the above relation, when compared with the relation between the axial stress and the bending moment, leads to

$$M = -EI\cfrac{\mathrm{d}^2w}{\mathrm{d}x^2}$$

Since the shear force is given by $Q = \mathrm{d}M/\mathrm{d}x$, we also have

$$Q = -EI\cfrac{\mathrm{d}^3w}{\mathrm{d}x^3}$$

== Boundary considerations ==
The beam equation contains a fourth-order derivative in $x$. To find a unique solution $w(x,t)$ we need four boundary conditions. The boundary conditions usually model supports, but they can also model point loads, distributed loads and moments. The support or displacement boundary conditions are used to fix values of displacement ($w$) and rotations ($\mathrm{d}w/\mathrm{d}x$) on the boundary. Such boundary conditions are also called Dirichlet boundary conditions. Load and moment boundary conditions involve higher derivatives of $w$ and represent momentum flux. Flux boundary conditions are also called Neumann boundary conditions.

As an example consider a cantilever beam that is built-in at one end and free at the other as shown in the adjacent figure. At the built-in end of the beam there cannot be any displacement or rotation of the beam. This means that at the left end both deflection and slope are zero. Since no external bending moment is applied at the free end of the beam, the bending moment at that location is zero. In addition, if there is no external force applied to the beam, the shear force at the free end is also zero.

Taking the $x$ coordinate of the left end as $0$ and the right end as $L$ (the length of the beam), these statements translate to the following set of boundary conditions (assume $EI$ is a constant):

A cantilever beam.

$$w|_{x = 0} = 0 \quad ; \quad \frac{\partial w}{\partial x}\bigg|_{x = 0} = 0 \qquad \mbox{(fixed end)}\,$$

$$\frac{\partial^2 w}{\partial x^2}\bigg|_{x = L} = 0 \quad ; \quad \frac{\partial^3 w}{\partial x^3}\bigg|_{x = L} = 0 \qquad \mbox{(free end)}\,$$

A simple support (pin or roller) is equivalent to a point force on the beam which is adjusted in such a way as to fix the position of the beam at that point. A fixed support or clamp, is equivalent to the combination of a point force and a point torque which is adjusted in such a way as to fix both the position and slope of the beam at that point. Point forces and torques, whether from supports or directly applied, will divide a beam into a set of segments, between which the beam equation will yield a continuous solution, given four boundary conditions, two at each end of the segment. Assuming that the product EI is a constant, and defining $\lambda=F/EI$ where F is the magnitude of a point force, and $\tau=M/EI$ where M is the magnitude of a point torque, the boundary conditions appropriate for some common cases is given in the table below. The change in a particular derivative of w across the boundary as x increases is denoted by $\Delta$ followed by that derivative. For example, $\Delta w''=w''(x+)-w''(x-)$ where $w''(x+)$ is the value of $w''$ at the lower boundary of the upper segment, while $w''(x-)$ is the value of $w''$ at the upper boundary of the lower segment. When the values of the particular derivative are not only continuous across the boundary, but fixed as well, the boundary condition is written e.g., $\Delta w''=0^*$ which actually constitutes two separate equations (e.g., $w''(x-) = w''(x+)$ = fixed).

Boundary	$w'''$	$w''$	$w'$	$w$
Clamp			$\Delta w'=0^*$	$\Delta w=0^*$
Simple support		$\Delta w''=0$	$\Delta w'=0$	$\Delta w=0^*$
Point force	$\Delta w'''=\lambda$	$\Delta w''=0$	$\Delta w'=0$	$\Delta w=0$
Point torque	$\Delta w'''=0$	$\Delta w''=\tau$	$\Delta w'=0$	$\Delta w=0$
Free end	$w'''=0$	$w''=0$		
Clamp at end			$w'$ fixed	$w$ fixed
Simply supported end		$w''=0$		$w$ fixed
Point force at end	$w'''=\pm\lambda$	$w''=0$		
Point torque at end	$w'''=0$	$w''=\pm\tau$		

Note that in the first cases, in which the point forces and torques are located between two segments, there are four boundary conditions, two for the lower segment, and two for the upper. When forces and torques are applied to one end of the beam, there are two boundary conditions given which apply at that end. The sign of the point forces and torques at an end will be positive for the lower end, negative for the upper end.

== Loading considerations ==
Applied loads may be represented either through boundary conditions or through the function $q(x,t)$ which represents an external distributed load. Using distributed loading is often favorable for simplicity. Boundary conditions are, however, often used to model loads depending on context; this practice being especially common in vibration analysis.

By nature, the distributed load is very often represented in a piecewise manner, since in practice a load isn't typically a continuous function. Point loads can be modeled with help of the Dirac delta function. For example, consider a static uniform cantilever beam of length $L$ with an upward point load $F$ applied at the free end. Using boundary conditions, this may be modeled in two ways. In the first approach, the applied point load is approximated by a shear force applied at the free end. In that case the governing equation and boundary conditions are:

$$\begin{align}
& EI \frac{\mathrm{d}^4 w}{\mathrm{d} x^4} = 0 \\
& w|_{x = 0} = 0 \quad ; \quad \frac{\mathrm{d} w}{\mathrm{d} x}\bigg|_{x = 0} = 0 \quad ; \quad
\frac{\mathrm{d}^2 w}{\mathrm{d} x^2}\bigg|_{x = L} = 0 \quad ; \quad -EI \frac{\mathrm{d}^3 w}{\mathrm{d} x^3}\bigg|_{x = L} = F\,
\end{align}$$

Alternatively we can represent the point load as a distribution using the Dirac function. In that case the equation and boundary conditions are

$$\begin{align}
& EI \frac{\mathrm{d}^4 w}{\mathrm{d} x^4} = F \delta(x - L) \\
& w|_{x = 0} = 0 \quad ; \quad \frac{\mathrm{d} w}{\mathrm{d} x}\bigg|_{x = 0} = 0 \quad; \quad
\frac{\mathrm{d}^2 w}{\mathrm{d} x^2}\bigg|_{x = L} = 0\,
\end{align}$$

Note that shear force boundary condition (third derivative) is removed, otherwise there would be a contradiction. These are equivalent boundary value problems, and both yield the solution

$$w = \frac{F}{6 EI}(3 L x^2 - x^3)\,~.$$

The application of several point loads at different locations will lead to $w(x)$ being a piecewise function. Use of the Dirac function greatly simplifies such situations; otherwise the beam would have to be divided into sections, each with four boundary conditions solved separately. A well organized family of functions called singularity functions are often used as a shorthand for the Dirac function, its derivative, and its antiderivatives.

Dynamic phenomena can also be modeled using the static beam equation by choosing appropriate forms of the load distribution. As an example, the free vibration of a beam can be accounted for by using the load function:

$$q(x, t) = \mu \frac{\partial^2 w}{\partial t^2}\,$$

where $\mu$ is the linear mass density of the beam, not necessarily a constant. With this time-dependent loading, the beam equation will be a partial differential equation:

$$\frac{\partial^2}{\partial x^2} \left( EI \frac{\partial^2 w}{\partial x^2} \right) = -\mu \frac{\partial^2 w}{\partial t^2}.$$

Another interesting example describes the deflection of a beam rotating with a constant angular frequency of $\omega$:

$$q(x) = \mu \omega^2 w(x)\,$$

This is a centripetal force distribution. Note that in this case, $q$ is a function of the displacement (the dependent variable), and the beam equation will be an autonomous ordinary differential equation.

== Examples ==
=== Three-point bending ===
The three-point bending test is a classical experiment in mechanics. It represents the case of a beam resting on two roller supports and subjected to a concentrated load applied in the middle of the beam. The shear is constant in absolute value: it is half the central load, P / 2. It changes sign in the middle of the beam. The bending moment varies linearly from one end, where it is 0, and the center where its absolute value is PL / 4, is where the risk of rupture is the most important. The deformation of the beam is described by a polynomial of third degree over a half beam (the other half being symmetrical). The bending moments ($M$), shear forces ($Q$), and deflections ($w$) for a beam subjected to a central point load and an asymmetric point load are given in the table below.

Distribution	Max. value
Simply supported beam with central load	
$$M(x) = \begin{cases} \frac{Px}{2},  & \mbox{for } 0 \le x \le \tfrac{L}{2} \\ \frac{P(L-x)}{2}, & \mbox{for } \tfrac{L}{2} < x \le L \end{cases}$$	$M_{L/2} = \tfrac{PL}{4}$
$$Q(x) = \begin{cases} \frac{P}{2}, & \mbox{for } 0 \le x \le \tfrac{L}{2} \\ \frac{-P}{2}, & \mbox{for } \tfrac{L}{2} < x \le L \end{cases}$$	$|Q_0| = |Q_L| = \tfrac{P}{2}$
$$w(x) = \begin{cases} -\frac{Px(4x^2-3L^2)}{48EI}, & \mbox{for } 0 \le x \le \tfrac{L}{2} \\ \frac{P(x-L)(L^2-8Lx+4x^2)}{48EI}, & \mbox{for } \tfrac{L}{2} < x \le L \end{cases}$$	$w_{L/2} = \tfrac{PL^3}{48EI}$
Simply supported beam with asymmetric load	
$$M(x) = \begin{cases} \tfrac{Pbx}{L},  & \mbox{for } 0 \le x \le a  \\ \tfrac{Pbx}{L}-P(x-a)=\tfrac{Pa(L-x)}{L}, & \mbox{for } a < x \le L \end{cases}$$	$M_B = \tfrac{Pab}{L}$
$$Q(x) = \begin{cases} \tfrac{Pb}{L}, & \mbox{for } 0 \le x \le a  \\ \tfrac{Pb}{L}-P, & \mbox{for } a < x \le L \end{cases}$$	$Q_A = \tfrac{Pb}{L}$ $Q_C = \tfrac{Pa}{L}$
$$w(x) = \begin{cases} \tfrac{Pbx(L^2-b^2-x^2)}{6LEI}, &  0 \le x \le a \\ \tfrac{Pbx(L^2-b^2-x^2)}{6LEI}+\tfrac{P(x-a)^3}{6EI}, &  a < x \le L \end{cases}$$	$w_{\mathrm{max}} = \tfrac{\sqrt{3}Pb(L^2-b^2)^{\frac{3}{2}}}{27LEI}$ at $x = \sqrt{\tfrac{L^2-b^2}{3}}$

=== Cantilever beams ===
Another important class of problems involves cantilever beams. The bending moments ($M$), shear forces ($Q$), and deflections ($w$) for a cantilever beam subjected to a point load at the free end and a uniformly distributed load are given in the table below.

Distribution	Max. value
Cantilever beam with end load	
$M(x) = P(L-x)$	$M_A = PL$
$Q(x) = P$	$Q_{\mathrm{max}} = P$
$w(x) = \tfrac{Px^2(3L-x)}{6EI}$	$w_C = \tfrac{PL^3}{3EI}$
Cantilever beam with uniformly distributed load	
$M(x) =-\tfrac{q(L^2-2Lx+x^2)}{2}$	$M_A = \tfrac{qL^2}{2}$
$Q(x) = q(L-x),$	$Q_A = qL$
$w(x) = \tfrac{qx^2(6L^2-4Lx+x^2)}{24EI}$	$w_C = \tfrac{qL^4}{8EI}$

Solutions for several other commonly encountered configurations are readily available in textbooks on mechanics of materials and engineering handbooks.

=== Statically indeterminate beams ===
The bending moments and shear forces in Euler–Bernoulli beams can often be determined directly using static balance of forces and moments. However, for certain boundary conditions, the number of reactions can exceed the number of independent equilibrium equations. Such beams are called statically indeterminate.

The built-in beams shown in the figure below are statically indeterminate. To determine the stresses and deflections of such beams, the most direct method is to solve the Euler–Bernoulli beam equation with appropriate boundary conditions. But direct analytical solutions of the beam equation are possible only for the simplest cases. Therefore, additional techniques such as linear superposition are often used to solve statically indeterminate beam problems.

The superposition method involves adding the solutions of a number of statically determinate problems which are chosen such that the boundary conditions for the sum of the individual problems add up to those of the original problem.

(a) Uniformly distributed load q.	(b) Linearly distributed load with maximum q_{0}
$M_{\mathrm{max}} = \cfrac{qL^2}{12} ~;~~ w_{\mathrm{max}} = \cfrac{qL^4}{384EI}$	$M_{\mathrm{max}} = \cfrac{qL^2}{300}[3\sqrt{30} - 10] ~;~~ w_{\mathrm{max}} = \cfrac{qL^4}{2500EI}[75 - 7\sqrt{105}]$
(c) Concentrated load P	(d) Moment M_{0}

Another commonly encountered statically indeterminate beam problem is the cantilevered beam with the free end supported on a roller. The bending moments, shear forces, and deflections of such a beam are listed below:

Distribution	Max. value
$M(x) = -\tfrac{q}{8}(L^2-5Lx+4x^2)$	$$\begin{align} M_B & = -\tfrac{9qL^2}{128} \mbox{ at } x=\tfrac{5L}{8}\\ M_A & = \tfrac{qL^2}{8} \end{align}$$
$Q(x) = -\tfrac{q}{8}(8x -5L)$	$Q_A = -\tfrac{5qL}{8}$
$w(x) = \tfrac{qx^2}{48EI}(3L^2-5Lx+2x^2)$	$w_{\mathrm{max}} = \tfrac{(39 + 55\sqrt{33})}{65,536} \tfrac{qL^4}{EI} \mbox{ at } x=\tfrac{15-\sqrt{33}}{16}L$

== Extensions ==
The kinematic assumptions upon which the Euler–Bernoulli beam theory is founded allow it to be extended to more advanced analysis. Simple superposition allows for three-dimensional transverse loading. Using alternative constitutive equations can allow for viscoelastic or plastic beam deformation. Euler–Bernoulli beam theory can also be extended to the analysis of curved beams, beam buckling, composite beams, and geometrically nonlinear beam deflection.

Euler–Bernoulli beam theory does not account for the effects of transverse shear strain. As a result, it underpredicts deflections and overpredicts natural frequencies. For thin beams (beam length to thickness ratios of the order 20 or more) these effects are of minor importance. For thick beams, however, these effects can be significant. More advanced beam theories such as the Timoshenko beam theory (developed by the Russian-born scientist Stephen Timoshenko) have been developed to account for these effects.

=== Large deflections ===
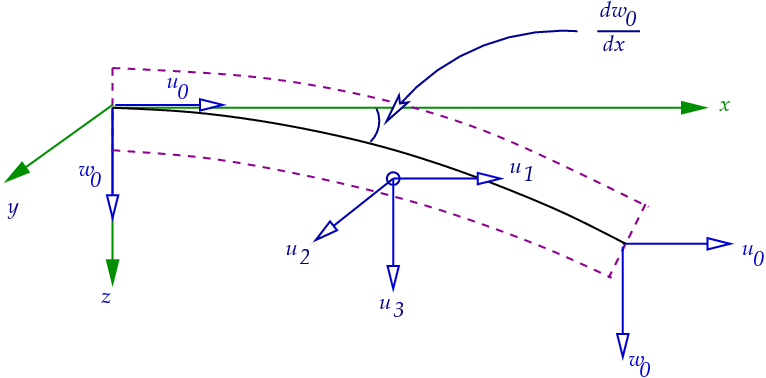
Euler–Bernoulli beam

The original Euler–Bernoulli theory is valid only for infinitesimal strains and small rotations. The theory can be extended in a straightforward manner to problems involving moderately large rotations provided that the strain remains small by using the von Kármán strains.

The Euler–Bernoulli hypotheses that plane sections remain plane and normal to the axis of the beam lead to displacements of the form

$$u_1 = u_0(x) - z \cfrac{\mathrm{d}w_0}{\mathrm{d}x} ~;~~u_2 = 0 ~;~~ u_3 = w_0(x)$$

Using the definition of the Lagrangian Green strain from finite strain theory, we can find the von Kármán strains for the beam that are valid for large rotations but small strains by discarding all the higher-order terms (which contain more than two fields) except $\frac{ \partial{w} }{ \partial{x^i} } \frac{ \partial{w} }{ \partial{x^j} }.$ The resulting strains take the form:

$$\begin{align}
\varepsilon_{11} & =  \cfrac{ \mathrm{d}  {u_0} }{ \mathrm{d}{x  } }
- z\cfrac{ \mathrm{d}^2{w_0} }{ \mathrm{d}{x^2} }
+ \frac{1}{2}\left[
\left(\cfrac{\mathrm{d}u_0}{\mathrm{d}x} - z\cfrac{\mathrm{d}^2w_0}{\mathrm{d}x^2}\right)^2
+ \left(\cfrac{\mathrm{d}w_0}{\mathrm{d}x}                                          \right)^2
\right]
\approx
\cfrac{ \mathrm{d}  {u_0} }{ \mathrm{d}{x  } }
- z\cfrac{ \mathrm{d}^2{w_0} }{ \mathrm{d}{x^2} }
+ \frac{1}{2}\left(
\frac{ \mathrm{d}{w_0} }{ \mathrm{d}{x} }
\right)^2
\\[0.25 em]
\varepsilon_{22} & = 0
\\[0.25 em]
\varepsilon_{33} & = \frac{1}{2}\left(\frac{ \mathrm{d}{w_0} }{ \mathrm{d}{x} }\right)^2
\\[0.25 em]
\varepsilon_{23} & = 0
\\[0.25 em]
\varepsilon_{31} & =
- \frac{1}{2}\left[
\left(\cfrac{\mathrm{d}u_0}{\mathrm{d}x}-z\cfrac{\mathrm{d}^2w_0}{\mathrm{d}x^2}\right)
\left(\cfrac{\mathrm{d}w_0}{\mathrm{d}x}\right)
\right]
\approx
0
\\[0.25 em]
\varepsilon_{12} & = 0.
\end{align}$$

From the principle of virtual work, the balance of forces and moments in the beams gives us the equilibrium equations

$$\begin{align}
\cfrac{\mathrm{d}N_{xx}}{\mathrm{d}x} + f(x) & = 0 \\
\cfrac{\mathrm{d}^2M_{xx}}{\mathrm{d}x^2} + q(x) +
\cfrac{\mathrm{d}}{\mathrm{d}x}\left(N_{xx}\cfrac{\mathrm{d}w_0}{\mathrm{d}x}\right) & = 0
\end{align}$$

where $f(x)$ is the axial load, $q(x)$ is the transverse load, and

$$N_{xx} = \int_A \sigma_{xx}~ \mathrm{d}A  ~;~~ M_{xx}  = \int_A z\sigma_{xx}~ \mathrm{d}A$$

To close the system of equations we need the constitutive equations that relate stresses to strains (and hence stresses to displacements). For large rotations and small strains these relations are

$$\begin{align}
N_{xx} & =
A_{xx}\left[\cfrac{\mathrm{d}u_0}{\mathrm{d}x} + \frac{1}{2}\left(\cfrac{\mathrm{d}w_0}{\mathrm{d}x}\right)^2 \right] -
B_{xx}\cfrac{\mathrm{d}^2w_0}{\mathrm{d}x^2} \\
M_{xx} & =
B_{xx}\left[\cfrac{\mathrm{d}u_0}{\mathrm{d}x} + \frac{1}{2}\left(\cfrac{\mathrm{d}w_0}{\mathrm{d}x}\right)^2 \right] -
D_{xx}\cfrac{\mathrm{d}^2w_0}{\mathrm{d}x^2}
\end{align}$$

where

$$A_{xx}  = \int_A E~\mathrm{d}A ~;~~ B_{xx}  = \int_A zE~\mathrm{d}A ~;~~ D_{xx}  = \int_A z^2E~\mathrm{d}A ~.$$

The quantity $A_{xx}$ is the extensional stiffness, $B_{xx}$ is the coupled extensional-bending stiffness, and $D_{xx}$ is the bending stiffness.

For the situation where the beam has a uniform cross-section and no axial load, the governing equation for a large-rotation Euler–Bernoulli beam is

$$EI~\cfrac{\mathrm{d}^4 w}{\mathrm{d}x^4} - \frac{3}{2}~EA~\left(\cfrac{\mathrm{d} w}{\mathrm{d}x}\right)^2\left(\cfrac{\mathrm{d}^2 w}{\mathrm{d}x^2}\right) = q(x)$$

== See also ==
- Applied mechanics
- Bending
- Bending moment
- Buckling
- Flexural rigidity
- Generalised beam theory
- Plate theory
- Sandwich theory
- Shear and moment diagram
- Singularity function
- Strain (materials science)
- Timoshenko beam theory
- Theorem of three moments (Clapeyron's theorem)
- Three-point flexural test
- List of topics named after Leonhard Euler
