= Elmer Otto Bergman =

Elmer Otto Bergman (January 21, 1892 - January 1973) was an American civil, mechanical and consulting engineer at the University of Colorado and at C. F. Braun & Company, later KBR Inc. He served as the 83rd president of the American Society of Mechanical Engineers in the year 1964–65.

== Biography ==
=== Youth, education, and early career ===
Bergman was born in 1892 in Kimball, Nebraska, the son of Andrew Bergman and Hannah (Sjoblom) Bergman. He graduated from Kimball High School in 1909. He started working as a teacher in the elementary schools, and served in the United States Navy for two years.

Next, Bergman started his studies at Creighton University in 1914, where he obtained his AB in 1920. He continued his studies at the University of Colorado, where he obtained his BSc in 1925 and his MSc in 1926.

Bergman continued his studies University Colorado in Civil Engineering and obtained another AB magna cum laude and BSc with special honour in 1932. Last he continued at Stanford University, and obtained his Doctor of Philosophy in 1938 under Stephen Timoshenko.

=== Academic career, in industry and honours ===
Bergman had started his academic career at the University of Colorado as instructor in 1924, was assistant professor from 1926 to 1932, and associate professor from 1932 to 1937.

After his graduation at Stanford University in 1938 Bergman moved into the industry. He joined C. F. Braun & Company, in Alhambra, California, an engineering company, which designed petroleum and chemical processing facilities and was later acquired by KBR Inc. He started as Stress analyst, was chief research from 1940 to 1944, and staff consultant from 1944 to 1958. In 1959 he became senior staff member at the National Engineering Science Companyin Pasadena.

Berman was elected Fellow of the American Society of Mechanical Engineers, and served as its president in the year 1964–65.

== Selected publications ==
- Elmer Otto Bergman. The Theory of Small Deflections of Rectangular Plates with Practical Applications. Leland Stanford junior university, 1938.
- Herbert James Gilkey, Glenn Murphy, Elmer Otto Bergman. Materials Testing: Theory, Practice and Significance of Physical Tests on Engineering Materials. McGraw-Hill Book Company, Incorporated, 1941.
- Elmer Otto Bergman. The ASME pressure vessel code: a joint effort for safe construction. Contributed for presentation at the American Society of Mechanical Engineers eighth Annual Petroleum Mechanical Engineering Conference, Houston, Texas ... September 29, 1953. Private press of C.F. Braun, 1953.

Articles, a selection

- Bergman, E. O. "The new-type code chart for the design of vessels under external pressure." TRANS. ASME 74 (1952): 647–054.
- Bergman, E. O. "The design of vertical pressure vessels subjected to applied forces." Pressure Vessel and Piping Design: Collected Papers 1927-1959 (1960).

Patents, a selection

- Bergman, Eugene O., Richard W. Hsieh, and John Geibel. "Apparatus for distributing gas and liquid during concurrent gas/liquid backwash in filter underdrain flumes." U.S. Patent No. 6,312,611. 6 Nov. 2001.
