= Egor Popov =

Russian-American engineer (1913-2001)

Egor Pavlovich Popov (Russian: Егор Павлович Попов; February 6, 1913 – April 19, 2001) was a structural and seismic engineer who helped transform the design of buildings, structures, and civil engineering around earthquake-prone regions.

A relative of inventor Alexander Stepanovich Popov, Egor Popov was born in Kiev, Russian Empire and after moving to the United States of America in 1927, he eventually earned a B.S. from UC Berkeley, his master's degree from MIT and his doctorate degree from Stanford in 1946 under Stephen Timoshenko.

During his career, Popov was primarily famous for his work doing research for the University of California, Berkeley. Some of his accomplishments include: working with buckling problems for NASA in Houston, Texas, involvement with the San Francisco–Oakland Bay Bridge, assisting with pipe testing for the Trans-Alaskan Pipeline, developing the Steel Moment Resisting Frame (resistance to earthquake forces), and eccentrically braced frames (ebf's).

== Textbooks ==
- Introduction to Mechanics of Solids, Prentice Hall, 1968. ISBN 0-13-048776-7
- Mechanics of Materials, 2nd ed., Prentice Hall, 1976. ISBN 0-13-571356-0
- Engineering Mechanics of Solids, 2nd ed., Prentice Hall, 1998. ISBN 0-13-726159-4
