= Nils Otto Myklestad =

American engineer and professor (1909–1972)

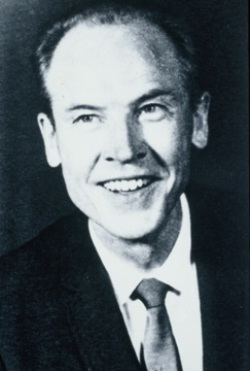
- American engineer Nils O. Myklestad
- Born: 24 March 1909; Williston, North Dakota, USA
- Died: 23 September 1972; Dallas, Texas, USA
- Education: Den Polytekniske Læreanstalt (College of Advanced Technology); Technical University of Denmark; Cornell University
- Known for: Mechanical vibration
- Awards: ASME Myklestad Award
- Scientific career
- Fields: Engineering
- Doctoral advisor: James N. Goodier

Nils Otto Myklestad (March 24, 1909 – September 23, 1972) was an American mechanical engineer and engineering professor. An authority on mechanical vibration, he was employed by a number of important US engineering firms and served on the faculty of several major engineering universities. Myklestad made significant contributions to both engineering practice and engineering education, publishing a number of widely influential technical journal papers and textbooks. He also was granted five US patents during his career.

Myklestad was employed in various technical capacities by AiResearch, North American Aviation, Westinghouse Electric, Fairbanks Morse, and Bell Helicopter Company. He served on the faculties of California Institute of Technology, University of California, Cornell University, Illinois Institute of Technology, University of Illinois, Arizona State University and the University of Texas at Arlington. He was elected fellow of the American Society of Mechanical Engineers (ASME) in 1967 and fellow of the American Association for the Advancement of Science (AAAS) in 1969.

== Biography ==
=== Early career ===
Nils O Myklestad was born in 1909 in Williston, North Dakota, United States but returned with his family to Norway where he was schooled and spent his childhood and youth. In 1932, Nils Myklestad graduated from the Den Polytekniske Læreanstalt (College of Advanced Technology), now Technical University of Denmark in Copenhagen, Denmark with a BS in Engineering.

Shortly afterwards he returned to the United States and was employed as an engineer by Westinghouse and Fairbanks Morse, 1932 -1937. He joined the University of California Berkeley in 1937 serving as a Teaching Assistant until 1938. In 1940 he moved to Cornell University as an Instructor in Mechanics, and studying under James N. Goodier, earned a Ph.D. in Engineering Mechanics from Cornell in 1940. In 1940 N. O. Myklestad was appointed Assistant Professor of Machine Design at Illinois Institute of Technology where he served until 1942.

=== Work at Guggenheim Aeronautical Laboratory ===
From 1942 to 1945 he was the Research Associate in charge of Vibration and Flutter, Guggenheim Aeronautical Laboratory, California Institute of Technology. It was during this time that he made a number of significant contributions to the theory and practice of engineering. In 1944, he published “A New Method of Calculating Natural Modes of Uncoupled Bending Vibration of Airplane Wings and Other Types of Beams”. An efficient numerical method for finding the undamped natural frequencies and mode shapes of structures modeled with numerous beam and inertia elements, the tabular procedure became known as the Myklestad Method. This approach while more complex, is similar to methods developed earlier for torsional systems, and in the introductory sections of Myklestad's article the path-finding work of Heinrich Holzer is credited. In 1945, a similar numerical method was published by M. A. Prohl, "A General Method for Calculating Critical Speeds of Flexible Rotors". As a consequence the method is also often called the Myklestad-Prohl method or Prohl-Myklestad method. See also Rotordynamics.

In any event, the practical importance of the Myklestad Method established a worldwide reputation for its author and has been, and continues to be to this day, widely used for calculation of natural frequencies and normal modes of rotating and nonrotating beam structures. The method has been used in many different applications including vibration analysis of airplane wings and fuselages, helicopter rotor blades, wind turbine blades, naval ship hulls, and rocket powered launch vehicles. The following citation examples, of about 1000 from a Google book search on 'Myklestad Method', show not only the range of structures analyzed by this method but the time span of its use as well. When matrix methods became popular, the Myklestad Method was recast into what became known as the transfer matrix method.

During the time he was employed at the Guggenheim Aeronautical Laboratory, he extended the Myklestad Method to include coupled bending-torsion vibration. and also developed one of the first efficient and numerically accurate methods of calculating the flutter speed of a multi-mass airplane wing model. This approach was used in the flutter analysis of both the B-36 bomber and the Hughes Aircraft Spruce Goose flying boat (Hughes H-4 Hercules). During this highly productive period he also published the first version of his popular book Vibration Analysis.

=== Work in Industry & Academia, 1947 - 1972 ===
In 1947, Myklestad accepted a position as Professor of Theoretical and Applied Mechanics at the University of Illinois where he supervised a number of master's theses and PhD dissertations. He then joined North American Aviation in 1952 where he was in charge of the Navajo Missile Program. From 1954 until 1955 he was Chief of the Systems Analysis Section of Aerophysics Development Company. Myklestad joined AiResearch Manufacturing Company of Arizona in 1955 where he remained as Research Project Engineer until 1961 when he accepted a position as Professor of Engineering at Arizona State University. In 1967 he joined the University of Texas at Arlington as a Professor of Engineering Mechanics. While living in Arlington, TX he also served as a consultant to Bell Helicopter.

The author of a number of significant technical articles, he also published four important text books on engineering mechanics. The most widely known of these are his books on vibration analysis, first published by McGraw-Hill in 1944 as Vibration Analysis and revised as Fundamentals of Vibration Analysis in 1956. By using Cartesian tensor notation in his last three books, Engineering Mechanics, Statics of Deformable Bodies, and Cartesian Tensors, Myklestad became an early proponent of tensor analysis in the undergraduate engineering curriculum. During his varied and productive career he also received five US patents.

Myklestad had four children: Ingrid, Nancy, Erik, and Rolf. He died in 1972 at age 63 while serving as Professor of Aerospace Engineering and Engineering Mechanics at the University of Texas as Arlington.

== ASME - N. O. Myklestad Award ==
In 1991 The American Society of Mechanical Engineers, ASME, honored him by establishing the N.O. Myklestad Award presented every two years in recognition of a major innovative contribution to vibration engineering.

=== Myklestad Award Recipients ===
1991 N. O. Myklestad, Professor, Aerospace Engineering, University of Texas at Arlington (Posthumous)

1993 T. C. Huang, Professor of Engineering Physics, University of Wisconsin

1995 C. S. Hsu, Professor, Mechanical Engineering, University of California, Berkeley

1997 Donald E. Bently, Chairman & CEO of Bently Nevada Corp

1999 M. Prohl, Engineer (Ret), General Electric Company

2001 V. Melnikov, JINR Laboratory of Theoretical Physics, Dubna, Moscow region, Russia

2003 Y. K. Cheung, Professor of Civil Engineering, University of Hong Kong

2005 Christophe Pierre, Vice President of Academic Affairs, University of Illinois

2007 Kon-Well Wang, Professor, Mechanical Engineering, Pennsylvania State University

2009 Subhash Sinha, Professor, Mechanical Engineering, Auburn University

2011 Noel Perkins, Professor, Mechanical Engineering, University of Michigan

2013 Steven Shaw, University Distinguished Professor, Mechanical Engineering, Michigan State University

2015 Robert Parker, L.S. Randolph Professor of Mechanical Engineering, Virginia Polytechnic Institute and State University

2017 I. Y. Shen, Professor, Mechanical Engineering, University of Washington

2019 Chris Rahn, Professor, Mechanical Engineering, Penn State University

2020 Dan Segaleman, Professor, Mechanical Engineering, Michigan State University

2022 Bogdan Epureanu, Professor, Mechanical Engineering, University of Michigan

2024 Jiong Tang, Professor, Mechanical, Aerospace, and Manufacturing Engineering, University of Connecticut

== Books ==
N. O. Myklestad, Vibration Analysis, McGraw-Hill, 1944.

N. O. Myklestad, Fundamentals of Vibrations Analysis, McGraw-Hill, 1956.

N. O. Myklestad, "Vibration Considerations in Design," Part Two, Chapter 5 of Metals Engineering, Design, ASME Handbook, McGraw-Hill, 1965.

N. O. Myklestad, Engineering Mechanics, Charles E. Merrill, 1965.

N. O. Myklestad, Statics of Deformable Bodies, MacMillan, 1966.

N. O. Myklestad, Cartesian Tensors, Van Nostrand, 1967.

== Journal articles ==
N. O. Myklestad, "Two Problems of Thermal Stress in the Infinite Solid", J. Appl. Mech., vol. 9, 136, 1942.

R. B. Glassco and N. O. Myklestad, "Analysis of stretch-forming double-curved sheet-metal parts", A S M E Trans 66:161-8 April 1944.

N. O. Myklestad, "A New Method of Calculating Natural Modes of Uncoupled Bending Vibration of Airplane Wings and Other Types of Beams", Journal of the Aeronautical Sciences (Institute of the Aeronautical Sciences), Vol. 11, No. 2 (1944), pp. 153–162.

N. O. Myklestad, "New Method of Calculating Natural Modes of Coupled Bending-Torsion Vibration Modes of Beams," Trans ASME, Vol. 67. No. 1, Jan. 1945.

N. O. Myklestad, "A Simple Tabular Method of Calculating Deflections and Influence Coefficients of Beams", Journal of the Aeronautical Sciences (Institute of the Aeronautical Sciences), Vol. 13, No. 1 (1946), pp. 23–28.

N. O. Myklestad, "A Tabular Method of Calculating Helicopter Blade Deflections and Moments," Transactions of American Society of Mechanical Engineers, 1947.

N. O. Myklestad, "Numerical Analysis of Forced Vibrations of Beams," Journal of Applied Mechanics, 1952.

N. O. Myklestad, "The Concept of Complex Damping," Journal of Applied Mechanics, 1952, 19 (3) 20-30.

N. O. Myklestad and Kent L. Lawrence. "Transient Beam Response Calculations Using Euler's Method." AIAA Journal (1967): 376-378.[DOI: 10.2514/3.3988]
