= Generalised beam theory =

Engineering theory

In structural engineering and mechanical engineering, generalised beam theory (GBT) is a one-dimensional theory used to mathematically model how beams bend and twist under various loads. It is a generalization of classical Euler–Bernoulli beam theory that approximates a beam as an assembly of thin-walled plates that are constrained to deform as a linear combination of specified deformation modes.

== History ==
Its origin is due to Richard Schardt (1966). Since then many other authors have extended the initial (first-order elastic) GBT formulations developed by Schardt and his co-workers. Many extensions and applications of GBT have been developed by Camotim (Instituto Superior Técnico, University of Lisbon, Portugal) and collaborators, since the beginning of the 21st century.

== Description ==
The theory can be applied without restrictions to any prismatic thin-walled structural member exhibiting straight or curved axial axis (any loading, any cross-section geometry, any boundary conditions). GBT is in some ways analogous to the finite strip method and can be a more computationally efficient method than modeling a beam with a full 2D or 3D finite element method to predict the member structural behavior.

GBT has been widely recognized as an efficient approach to analyzing thin-walled members and structural systems. The efficiency arises mostly from its modal nature – the displacement field is expressed as a linear combination of cross-section deformation modes whose amplitudes vary continuously along the member length (x axis) - see Figures 2-3. Due to GBT assumptions inherent to a thin-walled member, only 3 non-null stress components are considered in the formulations (see Fig. 1).

Membrane displacement field (i.e., in the cross-section mid-surface):

$$\begin{align}
u(s,x) & = u_k(s) \zeta_{k,x}(x), \\
v(s,x) & = v_k(s) \zeta_k(x), \\
w(s,x) & = w_k(s) \zeta_k(x).
\end{align}$$

The GBT modal nature makes it possible to (i) acquire in-depth knowledge on the mechanics of the thin-walled member behaviour and (ii) judiciously exclude, from subsequent similar GBT analyses, those deformation modes found to play no (or negligible) role in the particular behaviour under scrutiny. Eliminating modes that play no role reduces the number of degrees of freedom involved in a GBT analysis and increases its computational efficiency. GBT has proven useful in the understanding of the structural behaviour under analysis as well as in its computational efficiency.

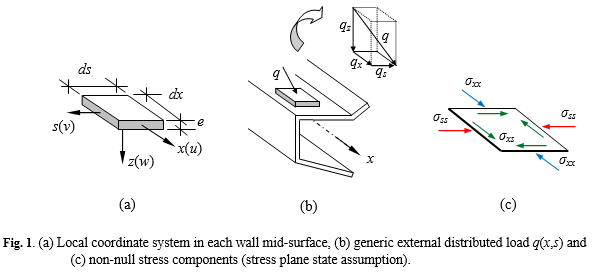

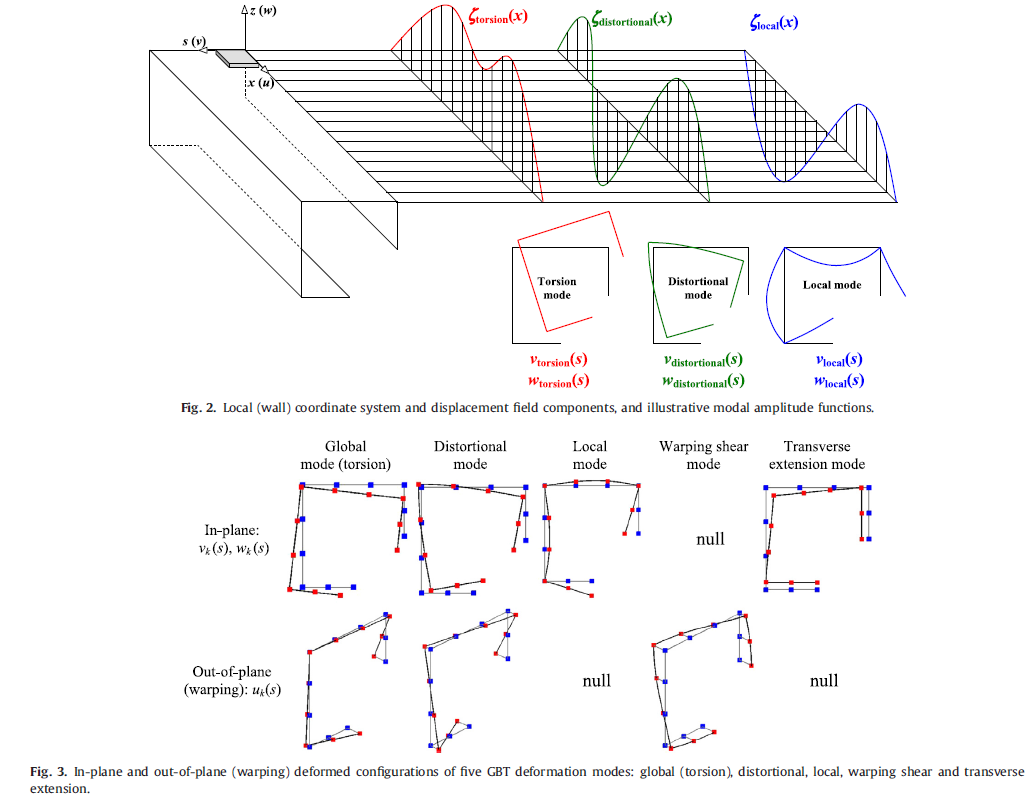
