= Global Sweeteners =

Global Sweeteners Holdings Limited 大成糖業控股有限公司
- Company type: Privately owned company
- Industry: Foods
- Founded: 2006; 20 years ago
- Headquarters: Hong Kong, China
- Area served: China
- Key people: Chairman: Kong Zhan-peng
- Products: Sweetener
- Parent: Global Bio-Chem
- Website: www.global-sweeteners.com

Global Sweeteners Holdings Limited (SEHK: 3889) is a listed food company in Hong Kong. It is involved in the manufacture and sale of corn-based sweetener products in China, including corn syrup, corn syrup solids, and sugar alcohol.

The company was established in 2006. It is headquartered in Hong Kong, while its production facilities are based in Changchun in Jilin Province and the Yangtze River Delta. It was spun off from Global Bio-Chem (SEHK: 809) and was listed on the Hong Kong Stock Exchange in 2007.

== Link ==
- Global Sweeteners Holdings Limited

== See also ==
- Global Bio-Chem
