= Global Bio-Chem =

Chinese biotechnology company

Global Bio-Chem Technology Group Co. Ltd.
- Native name: 大成生化集團控股有限公司
- Company type: Public
- Traded as: SEHK: 809
- Industry: Biotechnology
- Founded: 1994; 32 years ago
- Headquarters: Yau Tsim Mong, Hong Kong
- Area served: People's Republic of China
- Key people: Chairman: Liu Xiaoming and Xu Zhouwen
- Products: Corn-based biochemical products
- Parent: Changchun Dacheng Industry Group
- Subsidiaries: Global Sweeteners
- Website: www.biochem.com

Global Bio-Chem Technology Group (Chinese: 大成生化集團控股), also known as simply Global Bio-Chem, is a Chinese biotechnology company based in Hong Kong. The company is owned by Changchun Dacheng Industry Group.

== Business ==
Global Bio-Chem is involved in the manufacture, research and development of corn-based biochemical products in China. It is headquartered in Hong Kong, with its production facilities based in Changchun and Dehui, within the Jilin province, Northeast China.

== History ==
The company was established in 1994 and listed on the Hong Kong Stock Exchange in 2001. It spun off its sweeteners business, Global Sweeteners, on the Hong Kong Stock Exchange in 2007.

== See also ==
- Global Sweeteners
