= Matrix method =

The matrix method is a structural analysis method used as a fundamental principle in many applications in civil engineering.

The method is carried out, using either a stiffness matrix or a flexibility matrix.

== See also ==
- Direct stiffness method
- Flexibility method
