= Section modulus =

Geometric property of a structural member

In solid mechanics and structural engineering, section modulus is a geometric property of a given cross-section used in the design of beams or flexural members. Other geometric properties used in design include: area for tension and shear, radius of gyration for compression, and second moment of area and polar second moment of area for stiffness. Any relationship between these properties is highly dependent on the shape in question. There are two types of section modulus, elastic and plastic:

- The elastic section modulus is used to calculate a cross-section's resistance to bending within the elastic range, where stress and strain are proportional.
- The plastic section modulus is used to calculate a cross-section's capacity to resist bending after yielding has occurred across the entire section. It is used for determining the plastic, or full moment, strength and is larger than the elastic section modulus, reflecting the section's strength beyond the elastic range. A plastic hinge forms once every fiber across the cross-section has reached the yield stress, σ_{y}; beyond that point, the section cannot resist any further increase in bending moment. This limiting condition defines the plastic moment, M_{p}, and the plastic section modulus through M_{p} = σ_{y}Z_{p}.

Equations for the section moduli of common shapes are given below. The section moduli for various profiles are often available as numerical values in tables that list the properties of standard structural shapes.

Note: Both the elastic and plastic section moduli are different to the first moment of area. It is used to determine how shear forces are distributed.

== Notation ==
Different codes use varying notations for the elastic and plastic section modulus, as illustrated in the table below.

Section Modulus Notation
Region	Code	Section Modulus	
Region	Code	Elastic	Plastic
North America	USA: ANSI/AISC 360-10	S	Z
North America	Canada: CSA S16-14	S	Z
Europe	Europe (inc. Britain): Eurocode 3	W_{el}	W_{pl}
Europe	Britain (obsolete): BS 5950 ^{a}	Z	S
Asia	Japan: Standard Specifications for Steel and Composite Structures	W	Z
Asia	China: GB 50017	W	W_{p}
Asia	India: IS 800	Z_{e}	Z_{p}
Asia	Australia: AS 4100	Z	S
Notes: a) Withdrawn on 30 March 2010, Eurocode 3 is used instead.

The North American notation is used in this article.

== Elastic section modulus ==
The elastic section modulus is used for general design. It is applicable up to the yield point for most metals and other common materials. It is defined as

$$S = \frac{I}{c}$$

where:

I is the second moment of area (or area moment of inertia, not to be confused with moment of inertia), and
c is the distance from the neutral axis to the most extreme fibre.

It is used to determine the yield moment strength of a section

$$M_y = S \cdot \sigma_y$$

where σ_{y} is the yield strength of the material.

The table below shows formulas for the elastic section modulus for various shapes.

Elastic Section Modulus Equations
Cross-sectional shape	Figure	Equation	Comment	Ref.
Rectangle		$S = \cfrac{bh^2}{6}$	Solid arrow represents neutral axis	
doubly symmetric Ɪ-section (major axis)		$S_x = \cfrac{BH^2}{6} - \cfrac{bh^3}{6H}$ $S_x = \tfrac{I_x}{y}$, with $y = \cfrac{H}{2}$	NA indicates neutral axis	
doubly symmetric Ɪ-section (minor axis)		$S_y = \cfrac{B^2(H-h)}{6} + \cfrac{(B-b)^3 h}{6B}$	NA indicates neutral axis	
Circle		$S = \cfrac{\pi d^3}{32}$	Solid arrow represents neutral axis	
Circular hollow section		$S = \cfrac{\pi\left(r_2^4-r_1^4\right)}{4 r_2} = \cfrac{\pi (d_2^4 - d_1^4)}{32d_2}$	Solid arrow represents neutral axis	
Rectangular hollow section		$S = \cfrac{BH^2}{6}-\cfrac{bh^3}{6H}$	NA indicates neutral axis	
Diamond		$S = \cfrac{BH^2}{24}$	NA indicates neutral axis	
C-channel		$S = \cfrac{BH^2}{6} - \cfrac{bh^3}{6H}$	NA indicates neutral axis	
Equal and Unequal Angles	These sections require careful consideration because the axes for the maximum and minimum section modulus are not parallel with its flanges. Tables of values for standard sections are available.			

== Plastic section modulus ==
The plastic section modulus is used for materials and structures where limited plastic deformation is acceptable. It represents the section's capacity to resist bending once the material has yielded and entered the plastic range. It is used to determine the plastic, or full, moment strength of a section

$$M_p = Z \cdot \sigma_y$$

where σ_{y} is the yield strength of the material.

Engineers often compare the plastic moment strength against factored applied moments to ensure that the structure can safely endure the required loads without significant or unacceptable permanent deformation. This is an integral part of the limit state design method.

The plastic section modulus depends on the location of the plastic neutral axis (PNA). The PNA is defined as the axis that splits the cross section such that the compression force from the area in compression equals the tension force from the area in tension. For sections with constant, equal compressive and tensile yield strength, the area above and below the PNA will be equal

$$A_C = A_T$$

These areas may differ in composite sections, which have differing material properties, resulting in unequal contributions to the plastic section modulus.

The plastic section modulus is calculated as the sum of the areas of the cross section on either side of the PNA, each multiplied by the distance from their respective local centroids to the PNA.

$$Z = A_C y_C + A_T y_T$$

where:

A_{C} is the area in compression
A_{T} is the area in tension
y_{C}, y_{T} are the distances from the PNA to their centroids.

Plastic section modulus and elastic section modulus can be related by a shape factor k:

$$k = \frac{M_p}{M_y} = \frac{Z}{S}$$

This is an indication of a section's capacity beyond the yield strength of material. The shape factor for a rectangular section is 1.5.

The table below shows formulas for the plastic section modulus for various shapes.

Plastic Section Modulus Equations
Description	Figure	Equation	Comment	Ref.
Rectangular section		$Z = \frac{bh^2}{4}$	$A_C = A_T = \frac{bh}{2}$ $y_C = y_T = \frac{h}{4}$	
Rectangular hollow section		$Z = \cfrac{bh^2}{4}-(b-2t)\left(\cfrac{h}{2}-t\right)^2$	b = width, h = height, t = wall thickness	
For the two flanges of an Ɪ-beam with the web excluded		$Z = b_1t_1y_1+b_2t_2y_2\,$	b_{1}, b_{2} = width, t_{1}, t_{2} = thickness, y_{1}, y_{2} = distances from the neutral axis to the centroids of the flanges respectively.	
For an I Beam including the web		$Z = bt_f (d-t_f )+ \frac{t_w (d-2t_f)^2}{4}$		
For an I Beam (weak axis)		$Z = \frac{b^2t_f}{2} + \frac{t_w^2(d-2t_f)}{4}$	d = full height of the I beam	
Solid Circle		$Z = \cfrac{d^3}{6}$		
Circular hollow section		$Z = \cfrac{d_2^3-d_1^3}{6}$		
Equal and Unequal Angles	These sections require careful consideration because the axes for the maximum and minimum section modulus are not parallel with its flanges.			

== Use in structural engineering ==
In structural engineering, the choice between utilizing the elastic or plastic (full moment) strength of a section is determined by the specific application. Engineers follow relevant codes that dictate whether an elastic or plastic design approach is appropriate, which in turn informs the use of either the elastic or plastic section modulus. While a detailed examination of all relevant codes is beyond the scope of this article, the following observations are noteworthy:

- When assessing the strength of long, slender beams, it is essential to evaluate their capacity to resist lateral torsional buckling in addition to determining their moment capacity based on the section modulus.
- Although T-sections may not be the most efficient choice for resisting bending, they are sometimes selected for their architectural appeal. In such cases, it is crucial to carefully assess their capacity to resist lateral torsional buckling.
- While standard uniform cross-section beams are often used, they may not be optimally utilized when subjected to load moments that vary along their length. For large beams with predictable loading conditions, strategically adjusting the section modulus along the length can significantly enhance efficiency and cost-effectiveness.
- In certain applications, such as cranes and aeronautical or space structures, relying solely on calculations is often deemed insufficient. In these cases, structural testing is conducted to validate the load capacity of the structure.

== See also ==
- Beam theory
- Buckling
- List of area moments of inertia
- Second moment of area
- Structural testing
- Yield strength
