= Specific modulus =

Ratio of stiffness to mass for a material

Specific modulus is a materials property consisting of the elastic modulus per mass density of a material. It is also known as the stiffness to weight ratio or specific stiffness. High specific modulus materials find wide application in aerospace applications where minimum structural weight is required. The dimensional analysis yields units of distance squared per time squared. The equation can be written as:

$$\text{specific modulus} = E/\rho$$

where $E$ is the elastic modulus and $\rho$ is the density.

The utility of specific modulus is to find materials which will produce structures with minimum weight, when the primary design limitation is deflection or physical deformation, rather than load at breaking—this is also known as a "stiffness-driven" structure. Many common structures are stiffness-driven over much of their use, such as airplane wings, bridges, masts, and bicycle frames.

To emphasize the point, consider the issue of choosing a material for building an airplane. Aluminum seems obvious because it is "lighter" than steel, but steel is stronger than aluminum, so one could imagine using thinner steel components to save weight without sacrificing (tensile) strength. The problem with this idea is that there would be a significant sacrifice of stiffness, allowing, e.g., wings to flex unacceptably. Because it is stiffness, not tensile strength, that drives this kind of decision for airplanes, we say that they are stiffness-driven.

The connection details of such structures may be more sensitive to strength (rather than stiffness) issues due to effects of stress risers.

Specific modulus is not to be confused with specific strength, a term that compares strength to density.

== Applications ==
=== Specific stiffness in tension ===
The use of specific stiffness in tension applications is straightforward. Both stiffness in tension and total mass for a given length are directly proportional to cross-sectional area. Thus performance of a beam in tension will depend on Young's modulus divided by density.

=== Specific stiffness in buckling and bending ===
Specific stiffness can be used in the design of beams subject to bending or Euler buckling, since bending and buckling are stiffness-driven. However, the role that density plays changes depending on the problem's constraints.

==== Beam with fixed dimensions; goal is weight reduction ====
Examining the formulas for buckling and deflection, we see that the force required to achieve a given deflection or to achieve buckling depends directly on Young's modulus.

Examining the density formula, we see that the mass of a beam depends directly on the density.

Thus if a beam's cross-sectional dimensions are constrained and weight reduction is the primary goal, performance of the beam will depend on Young's modulus divided by density.

==== Beam with fixed weight; goal is increased stiffness ====
By contrast, if a beam's weight is fixed, its cross-sectional dimensions are unconstrained, and increased stiffness is the primary goal, the performance of the beam will depend on Young's modulus divided by either density squared or cubed. This is because a beam's overall stiffness, and thus its resistance to Euler buckling when subjected to an axial load and to deflection when subjected to a bending moment, is directly proportional to both the Young's modulus of the beam's material and the second moment of area (area moment of inertia) of the beam.

Comparing the list of area moments of inertia with formulas for area gives the appropriate relationship for beams of various configurations.

===== Beam's cross-sectional area increases in two dimensions =====
Consider a beam whose cross-sectional area increases in two dimensions, e.g. a solid round beam or a solid square beam.

By combining the area and density formulas, we can see that the radius of this beam will vary with approximately the inverse of the square of the density for a given mass.

By examining the formulas for area moment of inertia, we can see that the stiffness of this beam will vary approximately as the fourth power of the radius.

Thus the second moment of area will vary approximately as the inverse of the density squared, and performance of the beam will depend on Young's modulus divided by density squared.

===== Beam's cross-sectional area increases in one dimension =====
Consider a beam whose cross-sectional area increases in one dimension, e.g. a thin-walled round beam or a rectangular beam whose height but not width is varied.

By combining the area and density formulas, we can see that the radius or height of this beam will vary with approximately the inverse of the density for a given mass.

By examining the formulas for area moment of inertia, we can see that the stiffness of this beam will vary approximately as the third power of the radius or height.

Thus the second moment of area will vary approximately as the inverse of the cube of the density, and performance of the beam will depend on Young's modulus divided by density cubed.

However, caution must be exercised in using this metric. Thin-walled beams are ultimately limited by local buckling and lateral-torsional buckling. These buckling modes depend on material properties other than stiffness and density, so the stiffness-over-density-cubed metric is at best a starting point for analysis. For example, most wood species score better than most metals on this metric, but many metals can be formed into useful beams with much thinner walls than could be achieved with wood, given wood's greater vulnerability to local buckling. The performance of thin-walled beams can also be greatly modified by relatively minor variations in geometry such as flanges and stiffeners.

=== Stiffness versus strength in bending ===
Note that the ultimate strength of a beam in bending depends on the ultimate strength of its material and its section modulus, not its stiffness and second moment of area. Its deflection, however, and thus its resistance to Euler buckling, will depend on these two latter values.

== Approximate specific stiffness for various materials ==
Specific stiffness of the full range of materials

Specific stiffness of materials within the range 0.9–5.0 g/cm^{3} density and 10–1300 GPa stiffness

Approximate specific stiffness for various materials. No attempt is made to correct for materials whose stiffness varies with their density.
Material	Young's modulus (GPa)	Density (g/cm^{3})	Young's modulus per density; specific stiffness (10^{6} m^{2}s^{−2})	Young's modulus per density squared (10^{3} m^{5}kg^{−1}s^{−2})	Young's modulus per density cubed (m^{8}kg^{−2}s^{−2})	Reference
Latex foam, low density, 10% compression	5.9×10^{−7}	0.06	9.83×10^{−6}	0.000164	0.00273	
Reversible Assembled Cellular Composite Materials	0.0123	0.0072	1.71	237	32,953	
Self Reprogrammable Mechanical Metamaterials	0.0011129	0.0103	0.108	10.5	1,018	
Latex foam, low density, 40% compression	1.8×10^{−6}	0.06	3×10^{−5}	0.0005	0.00833	
Latex foam, high density, 10% compression	1.3×10^{−5}	0.2	6.5×10^{−5}	0.000325	0.00162	
Latex foam, high density, 40% compression	3.8×10^{−5}	0.2	0.00019	0.00095	0.00475	
Silica aerogel, medium density	0.00035	0.09	0.00389	0.0432	0.48	
Rubber (small strain)	0.055±0.045	1.055±0.145	0.059±0.051	0.06345±0.05655	0.0679±0.0621	
Expanded polystrene (EPS) foam, low density (1 lb/ft^{3})	0.00137	0.016	0.086	5.35	334	
Silica aerogel, high density	0.024	0.25	0.096	0.384	1.54	
Expanded polystrene (EPS) foam, medium density (3 lb/ft^{3})	0.00524	0.048	0.11	2.3	47	
Low-density polyethylene	0.2	0.925±0.015	0.215±0.005	0.235±0.005	0.255±0.015	
PTFE (Teflon)	0.5	2.2	0.23	0.10	0.047	
Duocel aluminum foam, 8% density	0.102	0.216	0.472	2.19	10.1	
Extruded polystrene (XPS) foam, medium density (Foamular 400)	0.013789	0.0289	0.48	16.5	571	
Extruded polystrene (XPS) foam, high density (Foamular 1000)	0.02551	0.0481	0.53	11	229	
HDPE	0.8	0.95	0.84	0.89	0.93	
Duocel copper foam, 8% density	0.736	0.717	1.03	1.43	2	
Polypropylene	1.2±0.3	0.9	1.33±0.33	1.48±0.37	1.65±0.41	
Polyethylene terephthalate	2.35±0.35	1.4125±0.0425	1.7±0.3	1.17±0.23	0.875±0.225	
Nylon	3.0±1.0	1.15	2.6±0.9	2.25±0.75	1.95±0.65	
Polystyrene	3.25±0.25	1.05	3.1±0.2	2.95±0.25	2.8±0.2	
Biaxially-oriented Polypropylene	3.2±1.0	0.9	3.56±1.11	3.95±1.23	4.39±1.37	
Medium-density fibreboard	4	0.75	5.3	7.1	9.5	
Titanium foam, low density	5.3	0.991	5.35	5.4	5.45	
Titanium foam, high density	20	3.15	6.35	2.02	0.64	
Foam glass	0.9	0.12	7.5	62.5	521	
Copper (Cu)	117	8.94	13	1.5	0.16	
Brass and bronze	112.5±12.5	8.565±0.165	13.0±2.0	1.55±0.25	0.18±0.03	
Zinc (Zn)	108	7.14	15	2.1	0.29	
Oak wood (along grain)	11	0.76±0.17	15.5±3.5	22.5±9.5	34.0±20.0	
Concrete (under compression)	40±10	2.4	17±4	6.95±1.75	2.9±0.7	
Glass-reinforced plastic	31.65±14.45	1.8	18±8	9.65±4.35	5.4±2.5	
Pine wood	8.963	0.505±0.155	20±6	47±26	120±89	
Balsa, low density (4.4 lb/ft^{3})	1.41	0.071	20	280	3,940	
Tungsten (W)	400	19.25	21	1.1	0.056	
Sitka spruce green	8.7±0.7	0.37	23.5±2	64±5	172±13	
Osmium (Os)	550	22.59	24	1.1	0.048	
Balsa, medium density (10 lb/ft^{3})	3.86	0.163	24	145	891	
Steel	200	7.9±0.15	25±0.5	3.2±0.1	0.41±0.02	
Titanium alloys	112.5±7.5	4.5	25±2	5.55±0.35	1.23±0.08	
6061 aluminium alloy	68	2.7	25.2	9.32	3.45	
Balsa, high density (16 lb/ft^{3})	6.57	0.265	25	94	353	
Wrought iron	200±10	7.7±0.2	26±2	3.35±0.35	0.445±0.055	
Magnesium metal (Mg)	45	1.738	26	15	8.6	
Sitka spruce dry	10.4±0.8	0.4	26±2	65±5	162±12	
Macor machineable glass-ceramic	66.9	2.52	26.55	10.53	8.14	
Cordierite	70	2.6	26.9	10.4	3.98	
Glass	70±20	2.6±0.2	28±10	11.2±4.8	4.4±2.1	
Tooth enamel (largely calcium phosphate)	83	2.8	30	11	3.8	
E-Glass fiber	81	2.62	31	12	4.5	
Molybdenum (Mo)	329	10.28	32	3.1	0.30	
Basalt fiber	89	2.7	33	12	4.5	
Zirconia	207	6.04	34.3	5.67	0.939	
Tungsten carbide (WC)	550±100	15.8	34.5±6.5	2.2±0.4	0.135±0.025	
S-Glass fiber	89	2.5	36	14	5.7	
Flax fiber	45±34	1.35±0.15	36.65±29.35	30±25	25±21	
single-crystal Yttrium iron garnet (YIG)	200	5.17	39	7.5	1.4	
Kevlar 29 (tensile only)	70.5	1.44	49	34	24	
Steatite L-5	138	2.71	50.9	18.8	6.93	
Mullite	150	2.8	53.6	19.1	6.83	
Dyneema SK25 Ultra-high-molecular-weight polyethylene (tensile only)	52	0.97	54	55	57	
Beryllium, 30% porosity	76	1.3	58.5	45	34.6	
Kevlar 49 (tensile only)	112.4	1.44	78	54	38	
Silicon	185	2.329	79	34	15	
Alumina fiber (Al_{2}O_{3})	300	3.595±0.315	84±7	24±4	6.76±1.74	
Syalon 501 Silicon nitride	340	4.01	84.8	21.1	5.27	
Sapphire	400	3.97	101	25.4	6.39	
Alumina	393	3.8	103	27.2	7.16	
Carbon fiber reinforced plastic (70:30 fibre:matrix, unidirectional, along grain)	181	1.6	113	71	44	
Dyneema SK78/Honeywell Spectra 2000 UHMWPE (tensile only)	121±11	0.97	125±11	128±12	132±12	
Silicon carbide (SiC)	450	3.21	140	44	14	
Beryllium (Be)	287	1.85	155	84	45	
Boron fiber	400	2.54	157	62	24	
Boron nitride	675	2.28	296	130	57	
Diamond (C)	1,220	3.53	347	98	28	
Dupont E130 carbon fiber	896	2.15	417	194	90	

Approximate specific stiffness for various species of wood
Material	Young's modulus (GPa)	Density (g/cm^{3})	Young's modulus per density; specific stiffness (10^{6} m^{2}s^{−2})	Young's modulus per density squared (10^{3} m^{5}kg^{−1}s^{−2})	Young's modulus per density cubed (m^{8}kg^{−2}s^{−2})
Applewood or wild apple (Pyrus malus)	8.76715	0.745	11.768	15.7959	21.2026
Ash, black (Fraxinus nigra)	11.0423	0.526	20.9929	39.9105	75.8755
Ash, blue (quadrangulata)	9.64974	0.603	16.0029	26.5388	44.0113
Ash, green (Fraxinus pennsylvanica lanceolata)	11.4738	0.610	18.8095	30.8352	50.5495
Ash, white (Fraxinus americana)	12.2485	0.638	19.1983	30.0914	47.1651
Aspen (Populus tremuloides)	8.21797	0.401	20.4937	51.1065	127.448
Aspen, large tooth (Populus grandidentata)	9.76742	0.412	23.7073	57.5421	139.665
Basswood (Tilia glabra or Tilia americanus)	10.091	0.398	25.3544	63.7045	160.061
Beech (Fagus grandifolia or Fagus americana)	11.5718	0.655	17.6669	26.9724	41.1793
Beech, blue (Carpinus caroliniana)	7.3746	0.717	10.2854	14.345	20.007
Birch, gray (Betula populifolia)	7.8159	0.552	14.1592	25.6508	46.4688
Birch, paper (Betula papyrifera)	10.9736	0.600	18.2894	30.4823	50.8039
Birch, sweet (Betula lenta)	14.9061	0.714	20.8769	29.2394	40.9515
Buckeye, yellow (Aesculus octandra)	8.12971	0.383	21.2264	55.4214	144.703
Butternut (Juglans cinerea)	8.13952	0.404	20.1473	49.8696	123.44
Cedar, eastern red (Juniperus virginiana)	6.00167	0.492	12.1985	24.7937	50.3938
Cedar, northern white (Thuja occidentalis)	5.57018	0.315	17.6831	56.1368	178.212
Cedar, southern white (Chamaecyparis thvoides)	6.42336	0.352	18.2482	51.8414	147.277
Cedar, western red (Thuja plicata)	8.03165	0.344	23.3478	67.8715	197.301
Cherry, black (Prunus serotina)	10.2578	0.534	19.2093	35.9724	67.3641
Cherry, wild red (Prunus pennsylvanica)	8.74753	0.425	20.5824	48.4292	113.951
Chestnut (Castanea dentata)	8.53179	0.454	18.7925	41.3931	91.1743
Cottonwood, eastern (Populus deltoides)	9.53206	0.433	22.014	50.8407	117.415
Cypress, southern (Taxodium distichum)	9.90472	0.482	20.5492	42.6332	88.4506
Dogwood (flowering) (Cornus Florida)	10.6402	0.796	13.3671	16.7928	21.0965
Douglas fir (coast type) (Pseudotsuga taxifolia)	13.3076	0.512	25.9915	50.7646	99.1495
Douglas fir (mountain type) (Pseudotsuga taxifolia)	9.62032	0.446	21.5702	48.3637	108.439
Ebony, Andaman marble-wood (India) (Diospyros kursii)	12.4544	0.978	12.7346	13.0211	13.314
Ebony, Ebè marbre (Mauritius, E. Africa) (Diospyros melanida)	9.8753	0.768	12.8585	16.7428	21.8005
Elm, American (Ulmus americana)	9.2967	0.554	16.7811	30.2907	54.6764
Elm, rock (Ulmus racemosa or Ulmus thomasi)	10.65	0.658	16.1854	24.5979	37.3829
Elm, slippery (Ulmus fulva or pubescens)	10.297	0.568	18.1285	31.9164	56.1908
Eucalyptus, Karri (W. Australia) (Eucalyptus diversicolor)	18.4855	0.829	22.2986	26.8982	32.4465
Eucalyptus, Mahogany (New South Wales) (Eucalyptus hemilampra)	15.7691	1.058	14.9046	14.0875	13.3153
Eucalyptus, West Australian mahogany (Eucalyptus marginata)	14.3373	0.787	18.2177	23.1483	29.4133
Fir, balsam (Abies balsamea)	8.62005	0.414	20.8214	50.2932	121.481
Fir, silver (Abies amabilis)	10.552	0.415	25.4264	61.2684	147.635
Gum, black (Nyssa sylvatica)	8.22778	0.552	14.9054	27.0025	48.9176
Gum, blue (Eucalyptus globulus)	16.5046	0.796	20.7344	26.0483	32.7239
Gum, red (Liquidambar styraciflua)	10.2479	0.530	19.3358	36.4826	68.835
Gum, tupelo (Nyssa aquatica)	8.71811	0.524	16.6376	31.7512	60.5939
Hemlock eastern (Tsuga canadensis)	8.29643	0.431	19.2492	44.6618	103.624
Hemlock, mountain (Tsuga martensiana)	7.8159	0.480	16.2831	33.9232	70.6733
Hemlock, western (Tsuga heterophylla)	9.95375	0.432	23.0411	53.3359	123.463
Hickory, bigleaf shagbark (Hicoria laciniosa)	13.0919	0.809	16.1828	20.0034	24.7261
Hickory, mockernut (Hicoria alba)	15.3964	0.820	18.7761	22.8977	27.9241
Hickory, pignut (Hicoria glabra)	15.7201	0.820	19.1708	23.379	28.511
Hickory, shagbark (Hicoria ovata)	14.9551	0.836	17.8889	21.3982	25.596
Hornbeam (Ostrya virginiana)	11.7582	0.762	15.4307	20.2502	26.5751
Ironwood, black (Rhamnidium ferreum)	20.594	1.077−1.30	17.48±1.64	14.97±2.78	12.93±3.56
Larch, western (Larix occidentalis)	11.6503	0.587	19.8472	33.8112	57.6
Locust, black or yellow (Robinia pseudacacia)	14.2	0.708	20.0565	28.3284	40.0119
Locust honey (Gleditsia triacanthos)	11.4247	0.666	17.1543	25.7572	38.6744
Magnolia, cucumber (Magnolia acuminata)	12.5133	0.516	24.2506	46.9972	91.0798
Mahogany (W. Africa) (Khaya ivorensis)	10.5814	0.668	15.8404	23.7131	35.4987
Mahogany (E. India) (Swietenia macrophylla)	8.01203	0.54	14.8371	27.4761	50.8817
Mahogany (E. India) (Swietenia mahogani)	8.72792	0.54	16.1628	29.9311	55.428
Maple, black (Acer nigrum)	11.1894	0.620	18.0474	29.1087	46.9495
Maple, red (Acer rubrum)	11.3267	0.546	20.7448	37.9942	69.5865
Maple, silver (Acer saccharinum)	7.89435	0.506	15.6015	30.833	60.9347
Maple, sugar (Acer saccharum)	12.6506	0.676	18.7139	27.6832	40.9515
Oak, black (Quercus velutina)	11.3071	0.669	16.9014	25.2637	37.7634
Oak, bur (Quercus macrocarpa)	7.09021	0.671	10.5666	15.7476	23.4688
Oak, canyon live (Quercus chrysolepis)	11.2678	0.838	13.4461	16.0455	19.1473
Oak, laurel (Quercus Montana)	10.9246	0.674	16.2086	24.0484	35.6801
Oak, live (Quercus virginiana)	13.543	0.977	13.8618	14.1881	14.5221
Oak, post (Quercus stellata or Quercus minor)	10.4245	0.738	14.1253	19.14	25.9349
Oak, red (Quercus borealis)	12.4937	0.657	19.0162	28.9441	44.0549
Oak, swamp chestnut (Quercus Montana (Quercus prinus))	12.2289	0.756	16.1758	21.3965	28.3023
Oak swamp white (Quercus bicolor or Quercus platanoides)	14.1804	0.792	17.9046	22.6068	28.5439
Oak, white (Quercus alba)	12.2681	0.710	17.279	24.3367	34.277
Paulownia (P. tomentosa)	6.894	0.274	25.1606	91.8269	335.134
Persimmon (Diospyros virginiana)	14.151	0.776	18.2358	23.4998	30.2832
Pine, eastern white (Pinus strobus)	8.80637	0.373	23.6096	63.2964	169.696
Pine, jack (Pinus banksiana or Pinus divericata)	8.51217	0.461	18.4646	40.0533	86.8836
Pine, loblolly (Pinus taeda)	13.2782	0.593	22.3916	37.7598	63.6759
Pine, longleaf (Pinus palustris)	14.1706	0.638	22.211	34.8135	54.5665
Pine, pitch (Pinus rigida)	9.46342	0.542	17.4602	32.2144	59.4361
Pine, red (Pinus resinosa)	12.3956	0.507	24.4489	48.2227	95.1139
Pine, shortleaf (Pinus echinata)	13.1899	0.584	22.5855	38.6738	66.2223
Poplar, balsam (Populus balsamifera or Populus candicans)	7.02156	0.331	21.2132	64.0881	193.62
Poplar, yellow (Liriodendron tulipifera)	10.3754	0.427	24.2984	56.905	133.267
Redwood (Sequoia sempervirens)	9.39477	0.436	21.5476	49.4212	113.351
Sassafras (Sassafras uariafolium)	7.74725	0.473	16.379	34.6278	73.209
Satinwood (Ceylon) (Chloroxylon swietenia)	10.7971	1.031	10.4725	10.1576	9.85217
Sourwood (Oxydendrum arboreum)	10.6206	0.593	17.91	30.2023	50.9313
Spruce, black (Picea mariana)	10.4833	0.428	24.4937	57.2283	133.711
Spruce, red (Picea rubra or Picea rubens)	10.5029	0.413	25.4308	61.5758	149.094
Spruce, white (Picea glauca)	9.81646	0.431	22.776	52.8446	122.609
Sycamore (Platanus occidentalis)	9.82626	0.539	18.2305	33.8229	62.7512
Tamarack (Larix laricina or Larix americana)	11.3169	0.558	20.2811	36.3461	65.1364
Teak (India) (Tectona grandis)	11.7189	0.5892	19.8896	33.7569	57.2928
Walnut, black (Juglans nigra)	11.6209	0.562	20.6777	36.7931	65.4682
Willow, black (Salix nigra)	5.03081	0.408	12.3304	30.2216	74.0726

Specific stiffness of the elements
Material	Young's modulus (GPa)	Density (g/cm^{3})	Young's modulus per density; specific stiffness (10^{6} m^{2}s^{−2})	Young's modulus per density squared (10^{3} m^{5}kg^{−1}s^{−2})	Young's modulus per density cubed (m^{8}kg^{−2}s^{−2})
Thallium	8	11.8	0.675	0.057	0.00481
Cesium	1.7	1.88	0.905	0.481	0.256
Arsenic	8	5.73	1.4	0.244	0.0426
Lead	16	11.3	1.41	0.124	0.011
Indium	11	7.31	1.5	0.206	0.0282
Rubidium	2.4	1.53	1.57	1.02	0.667
Selenium	10	4.82	2.08	0.431	0.0894
Bismuth	32	9.78	3.27	0.335	0.0342
Europium	18	5.24	3.43	0.655	0.125
Ytterbium	24	6.57	3.65	0.556	0.0846
Barium	13	3.51	3.7	1.06	0.301
Gold	78	19.3	4.04	0.209	0.0108
Plutonium	96	19.8	4.84	0.244	0.0123
Cerium	34	6.69	5.08	0.76	0.114
Praseodymium	37	6.64	5.57	0.839	0.126
Cadmium	50	8.65	5.78	0.668	0.0773
Neodymium	41	7.01	5.85	0.834	0.119
Hafnium	78	13.3	5.86	0.44	0.0331
Lanthanum	37	6.15	6.02	0.98	0.159
Promethium	46	7.26	6.33	0.872	0.12
Thorium	79	11.7	6.74	0.575	0.049
Samarium	50	7.35	6.8	0.925	0.126
Lutetium	67	9.84	6.81	0.692	0.0703
Terbium	56	8.22	6.81	0.829	0.101
Tin	50	7.31	6.84	0.936	0.128
Tellurium	43	6.24	6.89	1.1	0.177
Gadolinium	55	7.9	6.96	0.881	0.112
Dysprosium	61	8.55	7.13	0.834	0.0976
Holmium	64	8.79	7.28	0.827	0.0941
Erbium	70	9.07	7.72	0.852	0.0939
Platinum	168	21.4	7.83	0.365	0.017
Thulium	74	9.32	7.94	0.852	0.0914
Silver	85	10.5	8.1	0.772	0.0736
Antimony	55	6.7	8.21	1.23	0.183
Lithium	4.9	0.535	9.16	17.1	32
Palladium	121	12	10.1	0.837	0.0696
Zirconium	67	6.51	10.3	1.58	0.243
Sodium	10	0.968	10.3	10.7	11
Uranium	208	19.1	10.9	0.573	0.0301
Tantalum	186	16.6	11.2	0.671	0.0403
Niobium	105	8.57	12.3	1.43	0.167
Calcium	20	1.55	12.9	8.32	5.37
Yttrium	64	4.47	14.3	3.2	0.716
Copper	130	8.96	14.5	1.62	0.181
Zinc	108	7.14	15.1	2.12	0.297
Silicon	47	2.33	20.2	8.66	3.72
Vanadium	128	6.11	20.9	3.43	0.561
Tungsten	411	19.2	21.4	1.11	0.0576
Rhenium	463	21	22	1.05	0.0499
Rhodium	275	12.4	22.1	1.77	0.143
Nickel	200	8.91	22.5	2.52	0.283
Iridium	528	22.6	23.4	1.04	0.046
Cobalt	209	8.9	23.5	2.64	0.296
Scandium	74	2.98	24.8	8.31	2.78
Titanium	116	4.51	25.7	5.71	1.27
Magnesium	45	1.74	25.9	14.9	8.54
Aluminum	70	2.7	25.9	9.6	3.56
Manganese	198	7.47	26.5	3.55	0.475
Iron	211	7.87	26.8	3.4	0.432
Molybdenum	329	10.3	32	3.11	0.303
Ruthenium	447	12.4	36.1	2.92	0.236
Chromium	279	7.19	38.8	5.4	0.751
Beryllium	287	1.85	155	84	45.5

== See also ==
- Specific strength
