= Four-point flexural test =

Mechanical test for materials

The four-point flexural test provides values for the modulus of elasticity in bending $E_f$, flexural stress $\sigma_f$, flexural strain $\varepsilon_f$ and the flexural stress-strain response of the material. This test is very similar to the three-point bending flexural test. The major difference being that with the addition of a fourth bearing the portion of the beam between the two loading points is put under maximum stress, as opposed to only the material right under the central bearing in the case of three-point bending.

This difference is of prime importance when studying brittle materials, where the number and severity of flaws exposed to the maximum stress is directly related to the flexural strength and crack initiation. Compared with the three-point bending flexural test, there are no shear forces in the four-point bending flexural test in the area between the two loading pins. The four-point bending test is therefore particularly suitable for brittle materials that cannot withstand shear stresses very well.

It is one of the most widely used apparatus to characterize fatigue and flexural stiffness of asphalt mixtures.

== Testing method ==
The test method for conducting the test usually involves a specified test fixture on a universal testing machine. Details of the test preparation, conditioning, and conduct affect the test results. The sample is placed on two supporting pins a set distance apart and two loading pins placed at an equal distance around the center. These two loadings are lowered from above at a constant rate until sample failure.

Calculation of the flexural stress $\sigma_f$

4-point bend loading

$\sigma_f = \frac{3}{4}\frac{F L}{b d^2}$ for four-point bending test where the loading span is 1/2 of the support span (rectangular cross section)

$\sigma_f = \frac{F L}{b d^2}$ for four-point bending test where the loading span is 1/3 of the support span (rectangular cross section)

$\sigma_f = \frac{3}{2}\frac{F L}{b d^2}$ for three-point bending test (rectangular cross section)

in these formulas the following variables are used:

- $\sigma_f$ = Stress in outer fibers at midpoint, (MPa)
- $F$ = load at a given point on the load deflection curve, (N)
- $L$ = Support span, (mm)
- $b$ = Width of test beam, (mm)
- $d$ = Depth or thickness of tested beam, (mm)

== Advantages and disadvantages ==
Advantages of three-point and four-point bending tests over uniaxial tensile tests include:

- simpler sample geometries
- minimum sample machining is required
- simple test fixture
- possibility to use as-fabricated materials

Disadvantages include:

- more complex integral stress distributions through the sample

== Application with different materials ==
=== Ceramics ===
Ceramics are usually very brittle, and their flexural strength depends on both their inherent toughness and the size and severity of flaws. Exposing a large volume of material to the maximum stress will reduce the measured flexural strength because it increases the likelihood of having cracks reaching critical length at a given applied load. Values for the flexural strength measured with four-point bending will be significantly lower than with three-point bending., Compared with three-point bending test, this method is more suitable for strength evaluation of butt joint specimens. The advantage of four-point bending test is that a larger portion of the specimen between two inner loading pins is subjected to a constant bending moment, and therefore, positioning the joint region is more repeatable.

== Standards ==
- ASTM C1161: Standard Test Method for Flexural Strength of Advanced Ceramics at Ambient Temperature
- ASTM D6272: Standard Test Method for Flexural Properties of Unreinforced and Reinforced Plastics and Electrical Insulating Materials by Four-Point Bending
- ASTM C393: Standard Test Method for Core Shear Properties of Sandwich Constructions by Beam Flexure
- ASTM D7249: Standard Test Method for Facing Properties of Sandwich Constructions by Long Beam Flexure
- ASTM D7250: Standard Practice for Determining Sandwich Beam Flexural and Shear Stiffness

== See also ==
- Bending
- Euler–Bernoulli beam equation
- Flexural strength
- Three-point flexural test
- List of area moments of inertia
- Second moment of area
