= First moment of area =

Measurement of a shape about a certain axis

The first moment of area is based on the mathematical construct moments in metric spaces. It is a measure of the spatial distribution of a shape in relation to an axis.

The first moment of area of a shape, about a certain axis, equals the sum over all the infinitesimal parts of the shape of the area of that part times its distance from the axis [Σad].

First moment of area is commonly used to determine the centroid of an area.

== Definition ==
Given an area A of any shape and a division of that area into n very small elemental areas (dA_{i}), let x_{i} and y_{i} be the distances (coordinates) to each elemental area measured from a given x–y axis. The first moment of area in the x and y directions are respectively given by:
$$S_x = A \bar y = \sum_{i=1}^n {y_i \, dA_i} = \int_A y \, dA$$
and
$$S_y= A \bar x = \sum_{i=1}^n {x_i \, dA_i} = \int_A x \, dA.$$

The SI unit for first moment of area is a cubic metre (m^{3}). In the American Engineering and Gravitational systems the unit is a cubic foot (ft^{3}) or more commonly inch^{3}.

The static or statical moment of area, usually denoted by the symbol Q, is a property of a shape that is used to predict its resistance to shear stress. By definition:
$$Q_{j,x} = \int y_i \, dA,$$

where

- Q_{j,x} – the first moment of area "j" about the neutral x axis of the entire body (not the neutral axis of the area "j");
- dA – an elemental area of area "j";
- y – the perpendicular distance to the centroid of element dA from the neutral axis x.

=== Shear stress in a semi-monocoque structure ===
The equation for shear flow in a particular web section of the cross-section of a semi-monocoque structure is:
$$q = \frac{V_y S_x}{I_x}$$

- q – the shear flow through a particular web section of the cross-section
- V_{y} – the shear force perpendicular to the neutral axis x through the entire cross-section
- S_{x} – the first moment of area about the neutral axis x for a particular web section of the cross-section
- I_{x} – the second moment of area about the neutral axis x for the entire cross-section

Shear stress may now be calculated using the following equation:
$$\tau = \frac{q}{t}$$

- $\tau$ – the shear stress through a particular web section of the cross-section
- q – the shear flow through a particular web section of the cross-section
- t – the thickness of a particular web section of the cross-section at the point being measured

== See also ==
- Second moment of area
- Polar moment of inertia
- Section modulus
