= Girder bridge =

Bridge built of girders placed on bridge abutments and foundation piers

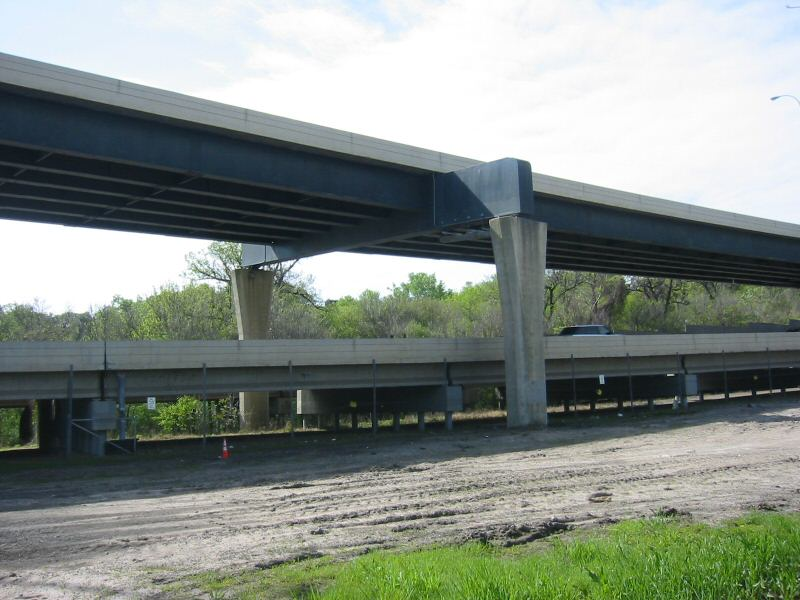
- Two different girder bridges. The top is a plate girder bridge, while the bottom is a concrete girder bridge.
- Span range: Short, Medium
- Material: Iron, wood, concrete
- Movable: No
- Design effort: Low
- Falsework required: No

A girder bridge is a bridge that uses girders as the means of supporting its deck. The two most common types of modern steel girder bridges are plate and box.

The term "girder" is often used interchangeably with "beam" in reference to bridge design. However, some authors define beam bridges slightly differently from girder bridges.

A girder may be made of concrete or steel. Many shorter bridges, especially in rural areas where they may be exposed to water overtopping and corrosion, utilize concrete box girder. The term "girder" is typically used to refer to a steel beam. In a beam or girder bridge, the beams themselves are the primary support for the deck, and are responsible for transferring the load down to the foundation. Material type, shape, and weight all affect how much weight a beam can hold. Due to the properties of the second moment of area, the height of a girder is the most significant factor to affect its load capacity. Longer spans, more traffic, or wider spacing of the beams will all directly result in a deeper beam. In truss and arch-style bridges, the girders are still the main support for the deck, but the load is transferred through the truss or arch to the foundation. These designs allow bridges to span larger distances without requiring the depth of the beam to increase beyond what is practical. However, with the inclusion of a truss or arch the bridge is no longer a true girder bridge.

== History ==
Girder bridges have existed for millennia in a variety of forms depending on resources available. The oldest types of bridges are the beam, arch and swing bridges, and they are still built today. These types of bridges have been built by human beings since ancient times, with the initial design being much simpler than what we utilize today. As technology advanced the methods were improved and were based on the utilization and manipulation of rock, stone, mortar and other materials that would serve to be stronger and longer.

In ancient Rome, the techniques for building bridges included the driving of wooden poles to serve as the bridge columns and then filling the column space with various construction materials. The bridges constructed by Romans were at the time basic but very dependable and strong while serving a very important purpose in social life.

As the Industrial Revolution came and went, new materials with improved physical properties were utilized; and wrought iron was replaced with steel due to steel's greater strength and larger application potential.

== Design ==
All bridges consist of two main parts: the substructure, and the superstructure. The superstructure is everything from the bearing pads, up - it is what supports the loads and is the most visible part of the bridge. The substructure is the foundation which transfers loads from the superstructure to the ground. Both must work together to create a strong, long-lasting bridge.

The superstructure consists of several parts:

- The deck is the roadway or walkway surface. In roadway applications it is usually a poured reinforced concrete slab, but can also be a steel grid or wood plank. The deck includes any road lanes, medians, sidewalks, parapets or railings, and miscellaneous items like drainage and lighting.
- The supporting structure consists of the steel or concrete system supporting the deck. This includes the girders themselves, diaphragms or cross-braces, and (if applicable) the truss or arch system. In a girder bridge this would include only the girders and the bracing system. The girders are the primary load support, while the bracing system both allows the girders to act together as a unit, and prevents the beams from toppling.
- The job of the bearing pads is to allow the superstructure to move somewhat independently of the substructure. All materials naturally expand and contract with temperature - if a bridge were completely rigid, this would cause unnecessary stress on the structure and could lead to failure or damage. By fixing the superstructure at one end, while allowing the other end of a span to move freely in the longitudinal direction, thermal stresses are alleviated and the lifespan of the bridge increased.

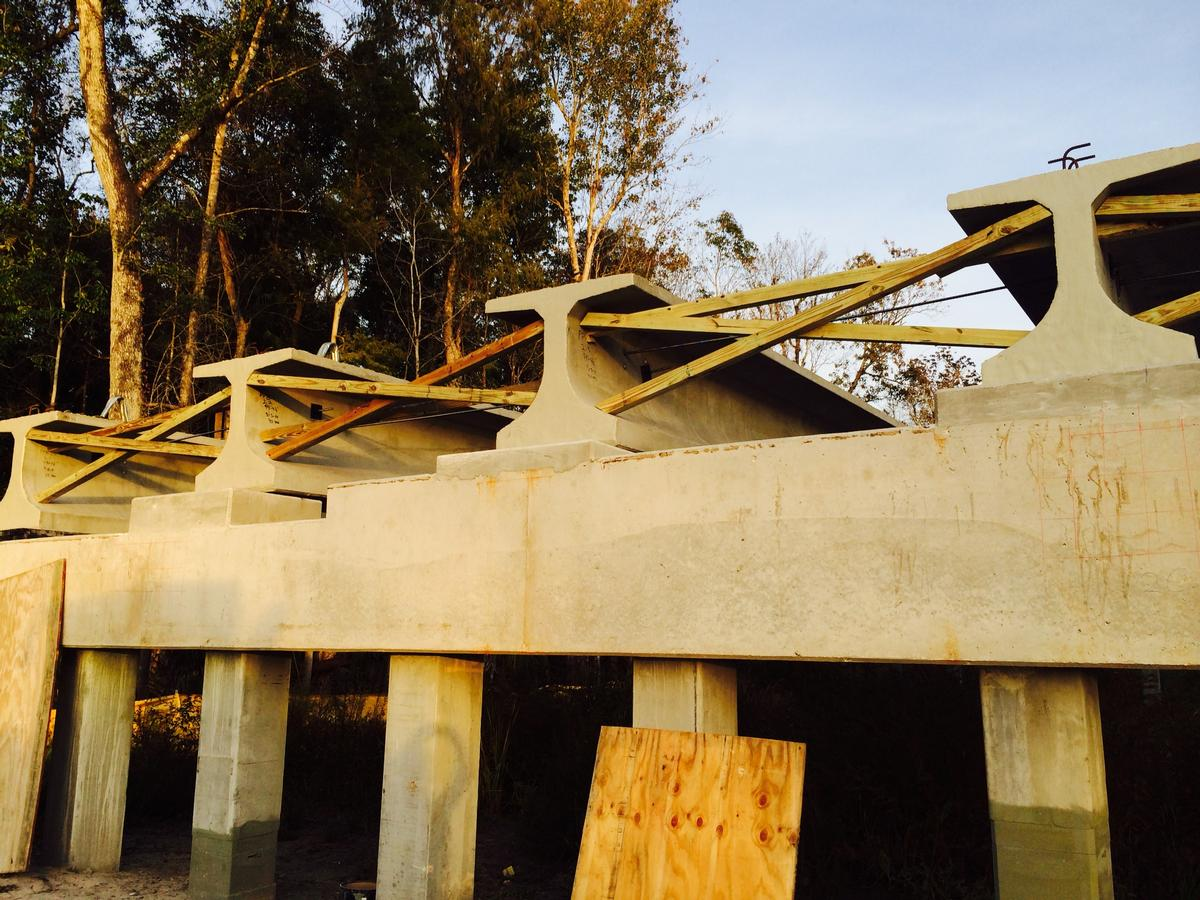
A concrete girder bridge pier during construction prior to installation of the bridge deck and parapets, consisting of multiple angled pylons for support (bottom), a horizontal concrete cap (center), and girders (top) with temporary wood bracing

The substructure is made of multiple parts as well:

- An abutment is a foundation that transfers the bridge structure to the roadway or walkway on solid ground. A pier is an intermediate support.
- The cap is the part that supports the bearing pads. Depending on the type of support structure, there may or may not be a cap. Wall piers and stub abutments do not require a cap, while a multi-column, hammerhead, or pile-bent pier will have a cap.
- The stem or stub is the main body of the foundation. It transfers the load from the superstructure, through the cap, down to the footer.
- The footer is the structure that transfers the loads into the ground. There are two primary types of systems: a spread footer, which is a simple concrete slab resting on bedrock; or a piling cap, which utilizes steel piles to reach sound bedrock that may be deep underground. Another system utilizes caissons or steel-reinforced concrete "pillars" below the stem.

== Types of girders ==
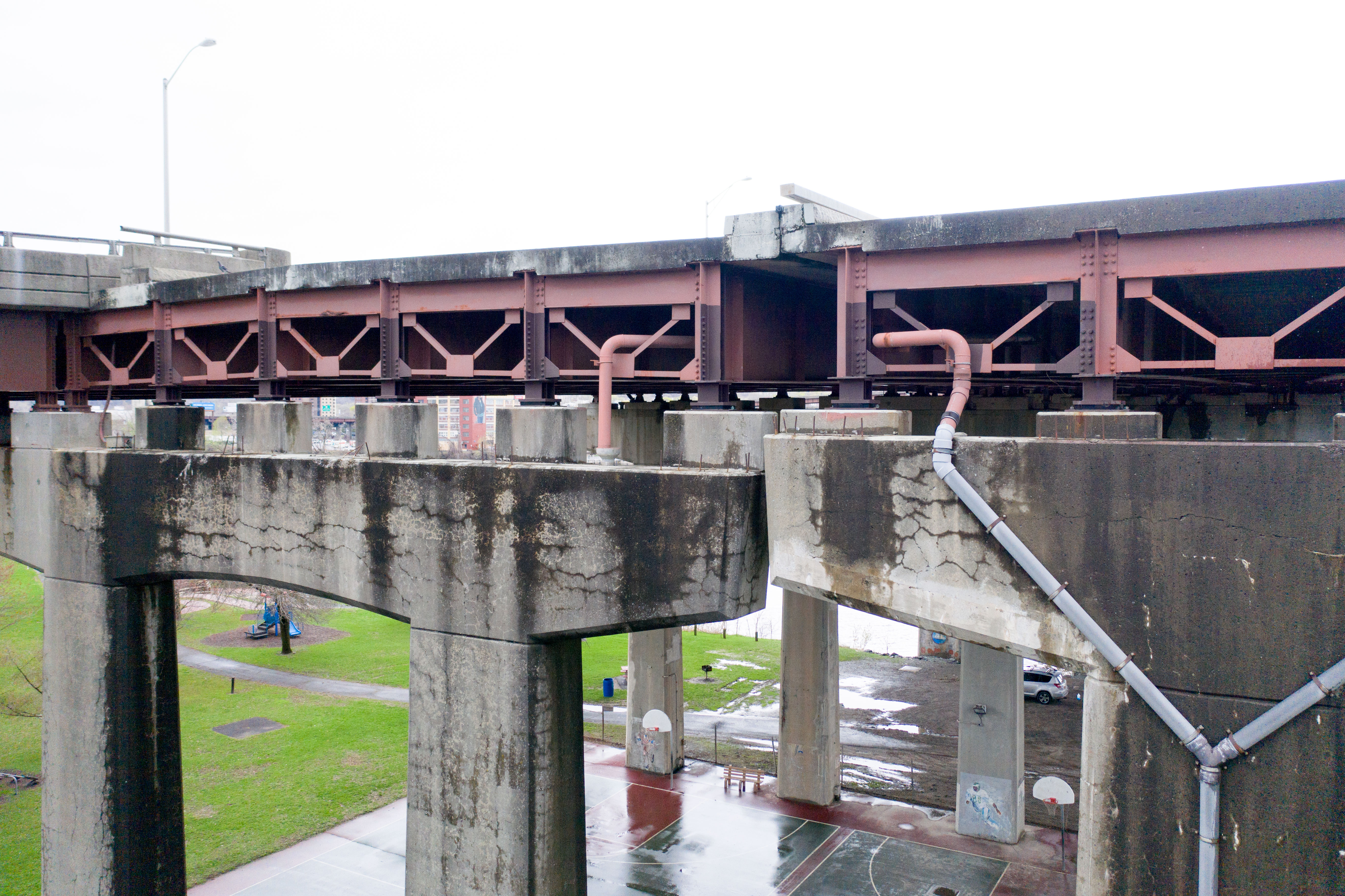
The stubs at the eastern end of the Dunn Memorial Bridge give a good cross section of girder bridge construction

- A rolled steel girder is a girder that has been fabricated by rolling a blank cylinder of steel through a series of dies to create the desired shape. These create standardized I-beam and wide flange beam shapes up to 100 feet in length.
- A plate girder is a girder that has been fabricated by welding plates together to create the desired shape. The fabricator receives large plates of steel in the desired thickness, and then cuts the flanges and web from the plate in the desired length and shape. Plate girders can have a greater height than rolled steel girders and are not limited to standardized shapes. The ability to customize a girder to the exact load conditions allows the bridge design to be more efficient. Plate girder can be used for spans between 10 metres and more than 100 metres (33 feet to more than 330 feet). Stiffeners are occasionally welded between the compression flange and the web to increase the strength of the girder.
- A box girder or "tub girder" is, as the name suggests, a box shape. They consist of two vertical webs, short top flanges on top of each web, and a wide bottom flange connecting the webs together. A box girder is particularly resistant to torsion and, while expensive, are utilized in situations where a standard girder might succumb to torsion or toppling effects.

== See also ==
- Beam bridge — the ancestor of the plate girder bridge
- Plate girder bridge
- Box girder bridge — an evolution of the plate girder bridge
