= Flexural strength =

Material property

The flexural strength is stress at failure in bending. It is equal to or slightly larger than the failure stress in tension.

Flexural strength, also known as modulus of rupture, bend strength, or transverse rupture strength, is a material property defined as the maximum stress at the outer surface of a specimen at the moment of failure (fracture or yielding) in a bending test. The transverse bending test is most frequently employed, in which a specimen having either a circular or rectangular cross-section is bent until fracture or yielding using a three-point flexural test technique. The flexural strength represents the highest stress experienced within the material at its moment of yield. It is measured in terms of stress, here given the symbol $\sigma$.

== Introduction ==
Fig. 1 - Beam of material under bending. Extreme fibers at B (compression) and A (tension)

Fig. 2 - Stress distribution through beam thickness

When an object is formed of a single material, like a wooden beam or a steel rod, is bent (Fig. 1), it experiences a range of stresses across its depth (Fig. 2). At the edge of the object on the inside of the bend (concave face) the stress will be at its maximum compressive stress value. At the outside of the bend (convex face) the stress will be at its maximum tensile value. These inner and outer edges of the beam or rod are known as the 'extreme fibers'. In brittle materials such as ceramics, glass and concrete, compressive strength is much greater than tensile strength, so failure in bending usually begins at the tensile (convex) face. Other materials, such as wood and some fibre-reinforced composites, can fail first on the compressive face.

== Flexural versus tensile strength ==
The flexural strength would be the same as the tensile strength if the material were homogeneous. In fact, most materials have small or large defects in them which act to concentrate the stresses locally, effectively causing a localized weakness. When a material is bent only the extreme fibers are at the largest stress so, if those fibers are free from defects, the flexural strength will be controlled by the strength of those intact 'fibers'. However, if the same material was subjected to only tensile forces then all the fibers in the material are at the same stress and failure will initiate when the weakest fiber reaches its limiting tensile stress. Therefore, it is common for flexural strengths to be higher than tensile strengths for the same material. Conversely, a homogeneous material with defects only on its surfaces (e.g., due to scratches) might have a higher tensile strength than flexural strength.

If we don't take into account defects of any kind, it is clear that the material will fail under a bending force which is smaller than the corresponding tensile force. Both of these forces will induce the same failure stress, whose value depends on the strength of the material.

For a rectangular sample, the resulting stress under an axial force is given by the following formula:

$$\sigma = \frac{F}{bd}$$

This stress is not the true stress, since the cross section of the sample is considered to be invariable (engineering stress).

- $F$ is the axial load (force) at the fracture point
- $b$ is width
- $d$ is the depth or thickness of the material

The resulting stress for a rectangular sample under a load in a three-point bending setup (Fig. 3) is given by the formula below (see "Measuring flexural strength").

The equation of these two stresses (failure) yields:

$$\sigma = \frac{3FL}{2bd^2}$$

Typically, L (length of the support span) is much larger than d, so the fraction $\frac{3L}{2d}$ is larger than one.

== Measuring flexural strength ==
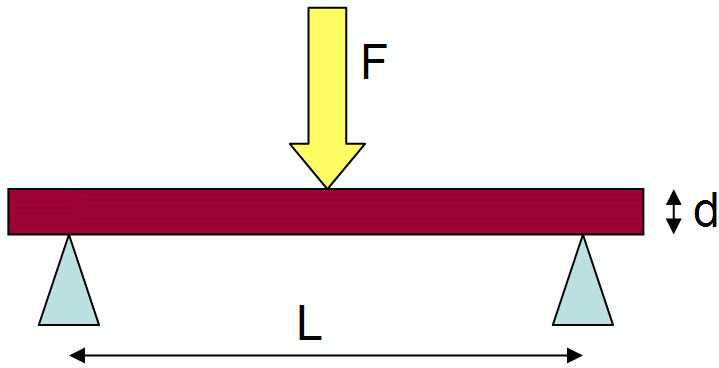
Fig. 3 - Beam under 3 point bending

For a rectangular sample under a load in a three-point bending setup (Fig. 3), starting with the classical form of maximum bending stress:

$\sigma = \frac{Mc}{I}$

- M is the moment in the beam
- c is the maximum distance from the neutral axis to the outermost fiber in the bending plane
- I is the second moment of area

For a simple supported beam as shown in Fig. 3, assuming the load is centered between the supports, the maximum moment is at the center and is equal to:

$M = P \times r = \left ( \frac{F}{2} \right )\times \left ( \frac{L}{2} \right ) = \frac{FL}{4}$

For a rectangular cross section,

$c = \frac{1}{2} d$ (central axis to the outermost fiber of the rectangle)

$I = \frac{1}{12}bd^3$ (Second moment of area for a rectangle)

Combining these terms together in the classical bending stress equation:

$\sigma = Mc\left ( \frac{1}{I} \right ) = \left ( \frac{FL}{4} \right ) \left ( \frac{d}{2} \right ) \left ( \frac{12}{bd^3} \right )$

$$\sigma = \frac{3FL}{2bd^2}$$

- F is the load (force) at the fracture point (N)
- L is the length of the support span
- b is width
- d is thickness

For a rectangular sample under a load in a four-point bending setup where the loading span is one-third of the support span:

$$\sigma = \frac{FL}{bd^2}$$

- F is the load (force) at the fracture point
- L is the length of the support (outer) span
- b is width
- d is thickness

For the 4 pt bend setup, if the loading span is 1/2 of the support span (i.e. L_{i} = 1/2 L in Fig. 4):

$$\sigma = \frac{3FL}{4bd^2}$$

If the loading span is neither 1/3 nor 1/2 the support span for the 4 pt bend setup (Fig. 4):

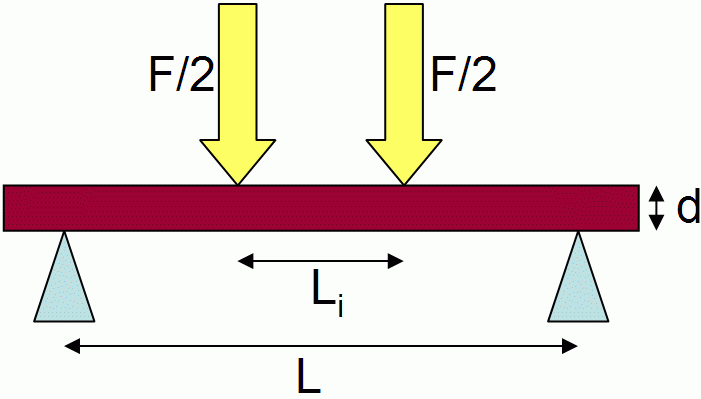
Fig. 4 - Beam under 4 point bending

$$\sigma = \frac{3F(L-L_i)}{2bd^2}$$

- L_{i} is the length of the loading (inner) span

== See also ==
- Euler–Bernoulli beam equation
- Flexural modulus
- Three-point flexural test
- Four-point flexural test
