= Macor =

Machinable glass-ceramic material

Macor is the trademark for a machinable glass-ceramic developed and sold by Corning Inc. It is a white material that looks somewhat like porcelain. Macor is a good thermal insulator and is stable up to temperatures of 1000 °C, with very little thermal expansion or outgassing. It can be machined using standard metalworking tools.

== Composition ==
Macor is made up of fluorphlogopite mica in a borosilicate glass matrix. Its composition is roughly: 46 wt% silica (SiO_{2}), 17 wt% magnesium oxide (MgO), 16 wt% aluminium oxide (Al_{2}O_{3}), 10 wt% potassium oxide (K_{2}O), 7 wt% boron trioxide (B_{2}O_{3}), 4 wt% fluorine (F).

== Properties ==
Macor has a density of 2.52 g/cm^{3}, a Young's modulus of 66.9 GPa at 25 °C, a specific stiffness of 26.55×10^{6} m^{2}s^{−2}, a Poisson’s Ratio of 0.29 and a thermal conductivity of 1.46 W/(m·K). It has a low-temperature (25 to 300 °C) thermal expansion of 9.3×10^{−6} K^{−1}. Its compressive strength is 50×10^{3} lb/in^{2} (~350 MPa). Nominal engineering properties are comparable to borosilicate glass.

Extremely machinable, Macor offers tight-tolerance capabilities, allowing complicated shape design (optimal performances up to ±0.013 mm for dimensions, < 0.5 μm for finished surface and up to 0.013 μm for polished surface). Macor remains continuously stable at 800 °C, with a maximum peak at 1000 °C under no load, and unlike ductile materials, doesn’t creep or deform. Its coefficient of thermal expansion readily matches most metals and sealing glasses. As an electric insulator, particularly at high temperatures, it is excellent at high voltages and a broad spectrum of frequencies.

Macor comes in a standard size maxi slab (about 36 cm × 36 cm × 6cm). Components, bars, rods and plates can be machined within the size of this slab (hand tools can be used).

== Applications ==
Macor is used in the following applications:

- Constant and ultra-high vacuum environments
- Laser technology
- Semiconductor / electronic
- Aerospace / space
- Medical/ laboratory equipment
- Fixtures
- Chemical
- Automobile
- Military
- Nuclear

== Safety ==
There are no major safety concerns or toxic effects associated with Macor. The dust created when machining it can be an irritant, and inhalation should be avoided.

== Machining guidelines ==
Key factors for successful machining are proper machining speeds and coolant. Macor can be machined with high-speed steel tools, but carbide tools are recommended for longer wear. Best results achieved by using a water-soluble coolant (such as Cimstar 40 – Pink) especially formulated for cutting and grinding glass or ceramics. No post-firing is required after machining.
