= Torsion constant =

Geometrical property of a bar's cross-section

Main quantities involved in bar torsion: $\theta$ is the angle of twist; T is the applied torque; L is the beam length.

The torsion constant or torsion coefficient is a geometrical property of a bar's cross-section. It is involved in the relationship between angle of twist and applied torque along the axis of the bar, for a homogeneous linear elastic bar. The torsion constant, together with material properties and length, describes a bar's torsional stiffness. The SI unit for torsion constant is m^{4}.

== History ==
In 1820, the French engineer A. Duleau derived analytically that the torsion constant of a beam is identical to the second moment of area normal to the section J_{zz}, which has an exact analytic equation, by assuming that a plane section before twisting remains planar after twisting, and a diameter remains a straight line. Unfortunately, that assumption is correct only in beams with circular cross-sections, and is incorrect for any other shape where warping takes place.

Non-circular cross-sections always have warping deformations that require more complex methods calculate the torsion constant. Few non-circular cross-sections have exact analytical solutions for the torsion constant but approximate numerical solutions exist for many shapes.

The torsional stiffness of short beams with open cross sections is significantly increased if the warping of the end sections is restrained by, for example, stiff end blocks.

== Formulation ==
For a beam of uniform cross-section along its length, the angle of twist (in radians) $\theta$ is:

$$\theta = \frac{TL}{GJ}$$

where:

T is the applied torque
L is the beam length
G is the modulus of rigidity (shear modulus) of the material
J is the torsional constant

Inverting the previous relation, we can define two quantities; the torsional rigidity,

$GJ = \frac{TL}{\theta}$ with SI units N⋅m^{2}/rad

And the torsional stiffness,

$\frac{GJ}{L} = \frac{T}{\theta}$ with SI units N⋅m/rad

== Examples ==
Bars with given uniform cross-sectional shapes are special cases.

=== Circle ===
$J_{zz} = J_{xx}+J_{yy} = \frac{\pi r^4}{4} + \frac{\pi r^4}{4} = \frac{\pi r^4}{2}$

where

r is the radius

This is identical to the second moment of area J_{zz} and is exact.

alternatively write: $J = \frac{\pi D^4}{32}$ where

D is the Diameter

=== Ellipse ===
$J = \frac{\pi a^3 b^3}{a^2 + b^2}$

where

a is the major radius
b is the minor radius

=== Square ===
$J \approx \,2.25 a^4$

where

a is half the side length.

=== Rectangle ===
$$J \approx\beta a b^3$$

where

a is the length of the long side
b is the length of the short side

$\beta$ is found from the following table:

a/b	$\beta$
1.0	0.141
1.5	0.196
2.0	0.229
2.5	0.249
3.0	0.263
4.0	0.281
5.0	0.291
6.0	0.299
10.0	0.312
$\infty$	0.333

Alternatively, the following equation can be used with an error of not greater than 4%:

$J \approx ab^3\left(\frac{16}{3}- {3.36} \frac{b}{a} \left ( 1- \frac{b^4}{12a^4} \right )\right)$

where

a is half the length of the long side
b is half the length of the short side

=== Thin walled open tube of uniform thickness ===
$J = \frac{1}{3}Ut^3$
t is the wall thickness
U is the length of the median boundary (perimeter of median cross section)

=== Circular thin walled open tube of uniform thickness ===
This is a tube with a slit cut longitudinally through its wall. Using the formula above:

$$U = 2\pi r$$
$J = \frac{2}{3} \pi r t^3$
t is the wall thickness
r is the mean radius
