= Flexural modulus =

Intensive property in mechanics

In mechanics, the flexural modulus, bending modulus, or modulus of rigidity is an intensive property that is computed as the ratio of stress to strain in flexural deformation, or the tendency for a material to resist bending. It is determined from the slope of a stress-strain curve produced by a flexural test (such as the ASTM D790), and uses units of force per area. The flexural modulus defined using the 2-point (cantilever) and 3-point bend tests assumes a linear stress strain response.

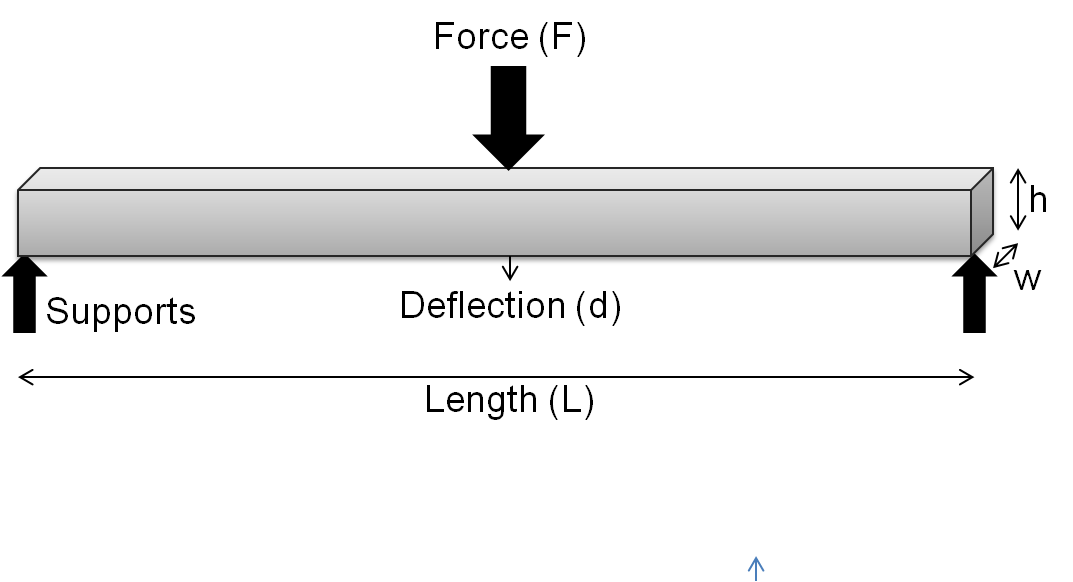
Flexural modulus measurement

For a 3-point test of a rectangular beam behaving as an isotropic linear material, where w and h are the width and height of the beam, I is the second moment of area of the beam's cross-section, L is the distance between the two outer supports, and d is the deflection due to the load F applied at the middle of the beam, the flexural modulus:

$$E_{\mathrm{flex}} = \frac {L^3 F}{4 w h^3 d}$$

From elastic beam theory

$$d = \frac {L^3 F}{48 I E }$$

and for rectangular beam

$$I = \frac{1}{12}wh^3$$

thus $E_{\mathrm{flex}} = E$ (Elastic modulus)

For very small strains in isotropic materials – like glass, metal or polymer – flexural or bending modulus of elasticity is equivalent to the tensile modulus (Young's modulus) or compressive modulus of elasticity. However, in anisotropic materials, for example wood, these values may not be equivalent. Moreover, composite materials like fiber-reinforced polymers or biological tissues are heterogeneous combinations of two or more materials, each with different material properties, therefore their tensile, compressive, and flexural moduli usually are not equivalent.

== Related pages ==
- Stiffness
