= Structural testing =

Measuring the ability of an object or assembly to withstand physical loading

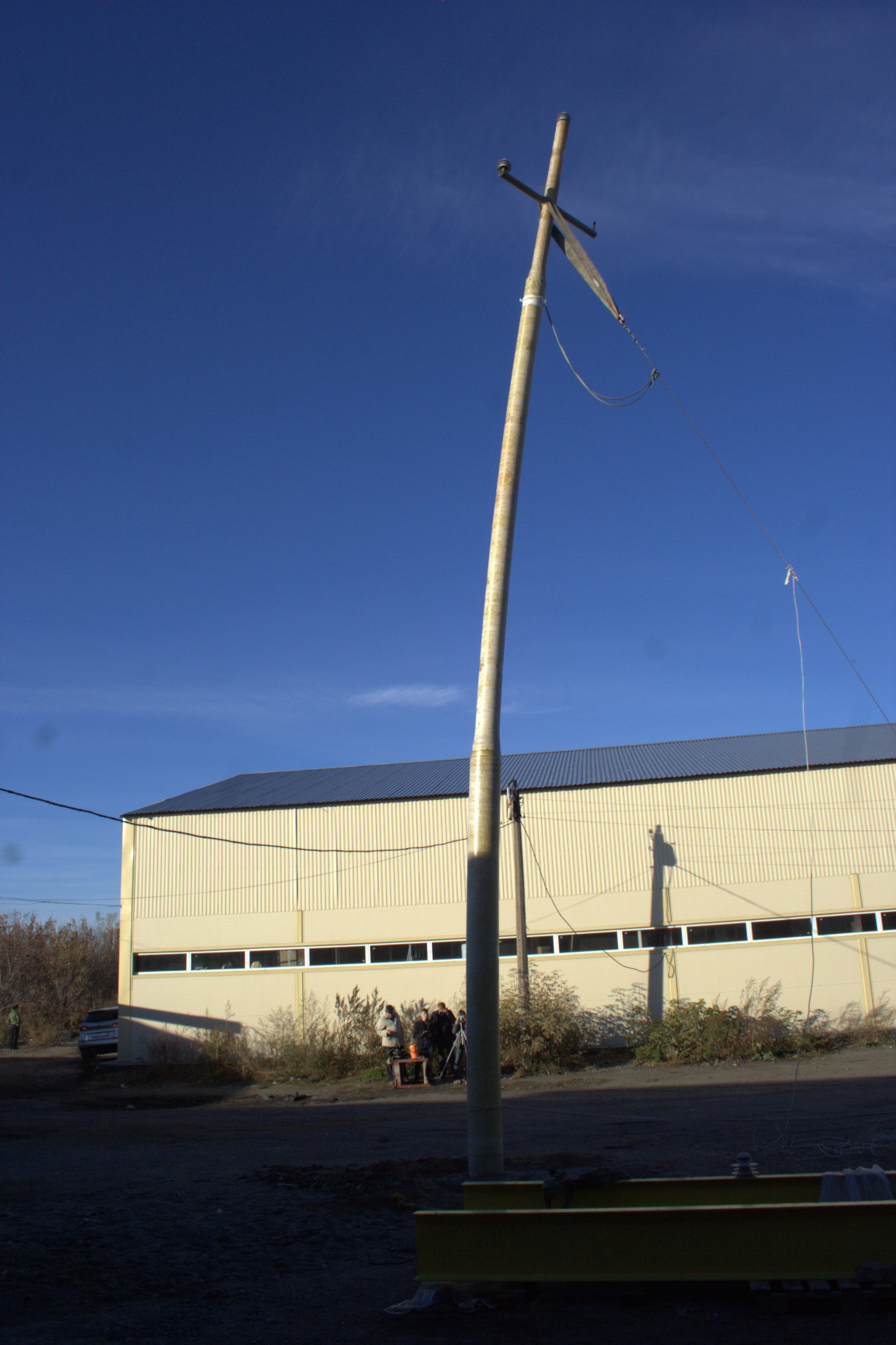
Testing a pylon for ability to resist wind loads

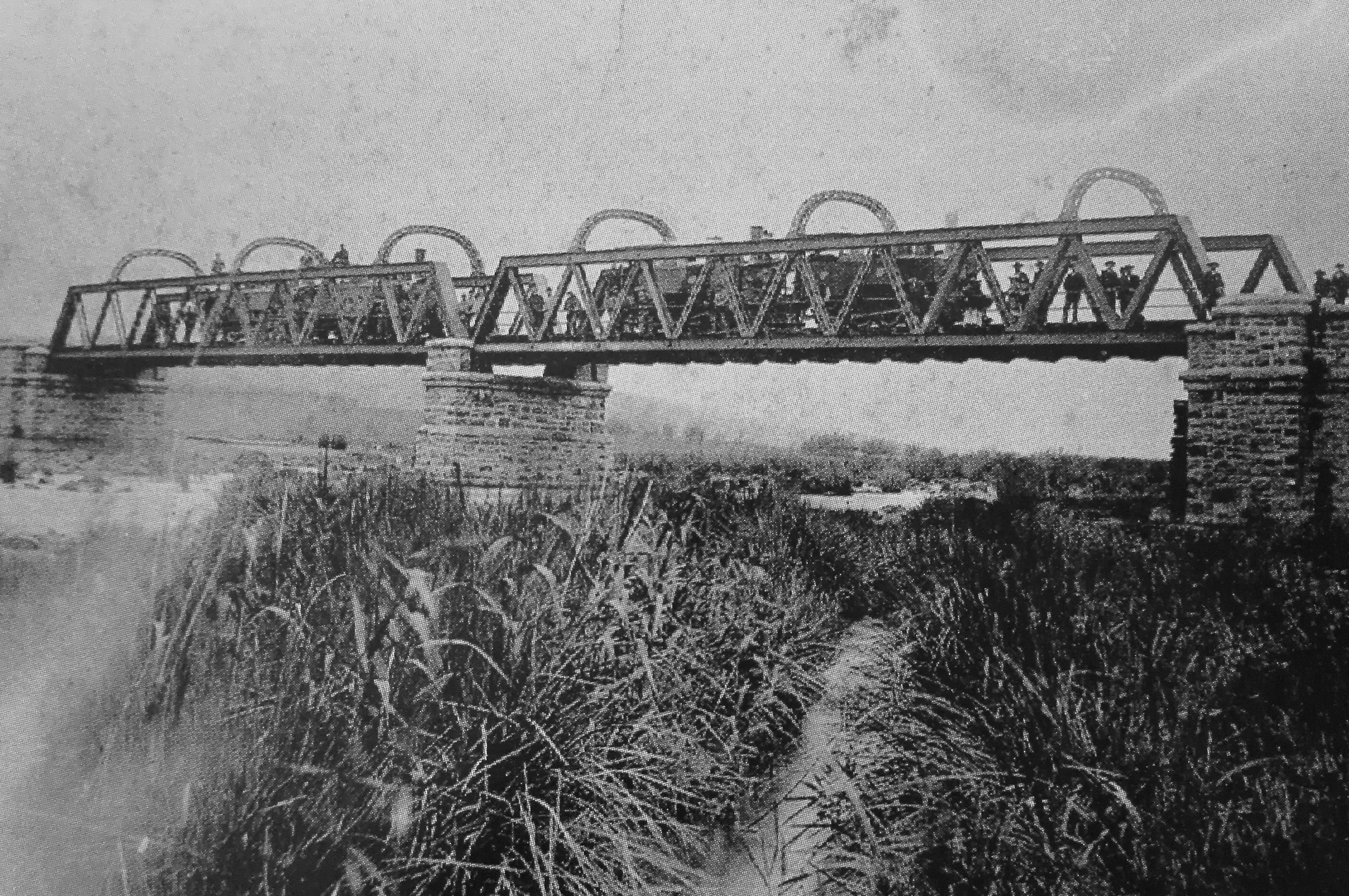
Load testing a railroad bridge, 1883

Structural testing is the evaluation of an object (which might be an assembly of objects) to ascertain its characteristics of physical strength. Testing includes evaluating compressive strength, shear strength, tensile strength, all of which may be conducted to failure or to some satisfactory margin of safety. Evaluations may also be indirect, using techniques such as x-ray ultrasound, and ground-penetrating radar, among others, to assess the quality of the object.

Structural engineers conduct structural testing to evaluate material suitability for a particular application and to evaluate the capacity of existing structures to withstand foreseeable loads.

Items may include buildings (or components), bridges, airplane wings or other types of structures.

== See also ==
- Structural analysis
- Structural load
