= Torsion (mechanics) =

Twisting of an object due to an applied torque

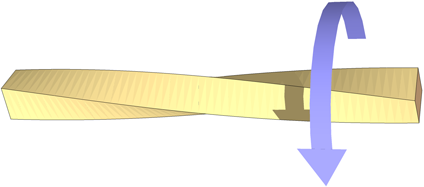
Torsion of a square-section bar

Example of torsion mechanics

In solid mechanics, torsion is the twisting of an object caused by an applied torque. It may be described as an angular deformation, measured by the rotation of a cross-section from its undeformed position. Torque is commonly expressed in newton metres (N·m) or foot-pound force (ft·lbf), while the resulting torsional shear stress is expressed in pascals (Pa) or pounds per square inch (psi).

In a circular shaft, the shear stress is tangent to circles centred on the shaft axis. In non-circular cross-sections, twisting is accompanied by warping, so transverse sections do not generally remain plane. Under uniform, unrestrained Saint-Venant torsion, torque and twist are related by

$$T=GJ_\mathrm{T}\Theta=\frac{GJ_\mathrm{T}}{\ell}\varphi,$$

where $T$ is the torque, $G$ is the shear modulus, $J_\mathrm{T}$ is the Saint-Venant torsion constant, $\Theta=\mathrm{d}\varphi/\mathrm{d}x$ is the twist rate, $\varphi$ is the total angle of twist over the length $\ell$, and $GJ_\mathrm{T}$ is the torsional rigidity. The geometric quantity $J_\mathrm{T}$ has dimensions of length to the fourth power. Only for circular shafts is the stress distribution simply

$$\tau(r)=\frac{Tr}{J_\mathrm{T}}.$$

Closed-form solutions are available for only a limited number of cross-sections. Thin open sections are commonly approximated by a sum of rectangular strips, while thin closed cells are commonly treated with Bredt's formula. More general sections are usually analysed numerically or by variational bounds. In 2026, Rocco Ditommaso and Felice Carlo Ponzo presented an open-access exact-arithmetic primal–dual procedure that provides certified lower and upper bounds for solid, open and hollow polygonal sections.

== Properties ==
For a circular shaft, the shear stress at radius $r$ is

$$\tau(r)=\frac{Tr}{J_\mathrm{T}}.$$

The maximum shear stress therefore occurs at the outer surface. Surface stress concentrations caused by notches, roughness or abrupt geometric changes can further increase the local stress.

For a prismatic member of constant cross-section and constant torque, the angle of twist is

$$\varphi=\frac{T\ell}{GJ_\mathrm{T}}.$$

For non-circular sections, $J_\mathrm{T}$ is generally not equal to the polar second moment of area, and the shear-stress distribution is not proportional to the distance from the axis.

== Torsion constants for common cross-sections ==
The following tables distinguish exact solutions, engineering asymptotic formulas and certified bounds. The symbol $J_\mathrm{T}$ denotes the geometric torsion constant; the physical torsional rigidity is $GJ_\mathrm{T}$.

=== Exact and engineering formulas ===
Cross-section	Torsion constant	Stress or validity
Solid circle, radius $R$	$\displaystyle J_\mathrm{T}=\frac{\pi R^4}{2}$	Exact. $\displaystyle \tau_{\max}=\frac{2T}{\pi R^3}$ at $r=R$.
Ellipse, semi-axes $p\geq q$	$\displaystyle J_\mathrm{T}=\frac{\pi p^3q^3}{p^2+q^2}$	Exact. $\displaystyle \tau_{\max}=\frac{2T}{\pi p q^2}$, attained at the ends of the minor axis.
Circular annulus, radii $R_i<R_e$	$\displaystyle J_\mathrm{T}=\frac{\pi}{2}\left(R_e^4-R_i^4\right)$	Exact. $\displaystyle \tau_{\max}=\frac{2TR_e}{\pi\left(R_e^4-R_i^4\right)}$.
Equilateral triangle, side $a$	$\displaystyle J_\mathrm{T}=\frac{\sqrt{3}}{80}a^4$	Exact. It is the only triangular section for which a cubic Prandtl stress function proportional to $\lambda_1\lambda_2\lambda_3$ is an exact solution.
Compact rectangle, sides $b\geq t$	$\displaystyle J_\mathrm{T}=\alpha(b/t)\,b t^3$	The coefficient $\alpha$ is obtained from a Fourier-series solution or tabulated values; there is no elementary closed form.
Thin rectangle, length $a$, thickness $s$	$\displaystyle J_\mathrm{T}\simeq\frac{1}{3}as^3$	Thin-strip approximation, valid for $a/s\gg1$. $\displaystyle \tau_{\max}\simeq\frac{3T}{as^2}$.
Open section made of thin rectangular walls	$\displaystyle J_\mathrm{T}\simeq\frac{1}{3}\sum_i b_i t_i^3$	Engineering thin-strip sum; valid when the individual walls are slender and junction effects are negligible.
Thin closed single-cell section	$\displaystyle J_\mathrm{T}\simeq\frac{4A_m^2}{\displaystyle\oint\frac{\mathrm{d}s}{t(s)}}$	Bredt approximation. $A_m$ is the area enclosed by the wall mid-line and $t(s)$ is the local thickness. The shear stress is $\displaystyle \tau(s)\simeq\frac{T}{2A_m t(s)}$.

== Certified primal–dual method ==
In 2026, Rocco Ditommaso and Felice Carlo Ponzo proposed an exact-arithmetic primal–dual procedure for certifying the Saint-Venant torsion constant of polygonal sections. For a convex polygon with rational vertex coordinates, the boundary function $B_0=\prod_i\ell_i$ is multiplied by a polynomial $q_p$ to form a kinematically admissible field $v_p=B_0q_p$. A statically admissible field is constructed as $\boldsymbol{\sigma}_p=(-x,-y)+\nabla^\perp\psi_p$. Optimising the two fields gives a lower and an upper bound,

$$J_p^-=4\mathbf{g}^{\mathsf T}K^{-1}\mathbf{g}\leq J_\mathrm{T}\leq J_p^+=\int_\Omega(x^2+y^2)\,\mathrm{d}A-\mathbf{b}^{\mathsf T}M_{\mathrm{red}}^{-1}\mathbf{b}.$$

Because the required integrals reduce to polynomial moments over rational triangles, the endpoints and the interval width are exact rational numbers rather than floating-point estimates. The width is the energy mismatch

$$J_p^+-J_p^-=\int_\Omega\left|\boldsymbol{\sigma}_p-\nabla v_p\right|^2\,\mathrm{d}A.$$

The same construction extends to non-convex open sections by using piecewise polynomial spaces on rational triangulations, and to multiply connected hollow sections by adding constants and flux constraints on the internal boundaries. The method does not replace the classical exact or thin-wall formulas; instead, it brackets the true value when no elementary formula exists and quantifies the error and sign of engineering approximations.

=== Examples of certified relations ===
Section or class	Certified relation	Notes
Convex rational polygon	$\displaystyle J_p^-\leq J_\mathrm{T}\leq J_p^+$	Global polynomial primal–dual certificate. Both endpoints are exact rational numbers.
Scalene triangle, area $A$, side lengths $a_1,a_2,a_3$	$\displaystyle \frac{4A^3}{5\left(a_1^2+a_2^2+a_3^2\right)}\leq J_\mathrm{T}$ $\displaystyle J_\mathrm{T}\leq\frac{A}{36}\left(a_1^2+a_2^2+a_3^2\right)$	Elementary two-sided certified interval.
Compact rectangle, sides $b\geq t$	$\displaystyle \frac{5b^3t^3}{18\left(b^2+t^2\right)}\leq J_\mathrm{T}$ $\displaystyle J_\mathrm{T}\leq\frac{bt\left(b^2+t^2\right)}{12}$	Elementary bounds. Tighter degree-dependent rational bounds are given in Appendix C of the open-access article.
Isosceles trapezoid, bases $b_1,b_2$, height $h$	$\displaystyle J_0^-(b_1,b_2,h)\leq J_\mathrm{T}\leq J_0^+(b_1,b_2,h)$	Closed parametric expressions are given in equations (C.4) and (C.5) of the open-access article; they are omitted here because of their length.
Open section decomposed into disjoint rectangular walls	$\displaystyle J_\mathrm{T}\geq\sum_i\frac{5b_i^3t_i^3}{18\left(b_i^2+t_i^2\right)}$	Certified lower bound, in contrast with the asymptotic thin-strip sum.
Non-convex open or hollow polygon	$\displaystyle J_h^-\leq J_\mathrm{T}\leq J_h^+$	Piecewise polynomial certificate on a rational triangulation. Hollow sections also require internal-boundary constants and flux constraints.
Sharp-corner rectangular tube, external dimensions $b\times h$, thickness $t$	Let $A_m=(b-t)(h-t)$, $b_i=b-2t$, and $h_i=h-2t$. $\displaystyle J_\mathrm{ramp}^-= \frac{2t\left(A_m+t^2/3\right)^2}{b+h-2t} \leq J_\mathrm{T}$ $\displaystyle J_\mathrm{T}\leq J_0^+= \frac{bh\left(b^2+h^2\right)-b_i h_i\left(b_i^2+h_i^2\right)}{12}$	The Bredt value is $\displaystyle J_\mathrm{Bredt}=\frac{2tA_m^2}{b+h-2t}$, and $J_\mathrm{Bredt}\leq J_\mathrm{ramp}^-$ for the stated family.

=== Reliability of commonly used relations ===
Type	Examples	Interpretation
Exact closed form	Circle, ellipse, circular annulus, equilateral triangle	Gives the exact Saint-Venant torsion constant.
Engineering or asymptotic formula	Thin-strip sum for open sections; Bredt formula for closed cells	Useful under geometric assumptions, but not a guaranteed bound in general.
Certified interval	Exact-arithmetic primal–dual bounds for rational polygonal sections	Guarantees $J^-\leq J_\mathrm{T}\leq J^+$; the interval width measures the residual uncertainty.

== Sample calculation ==
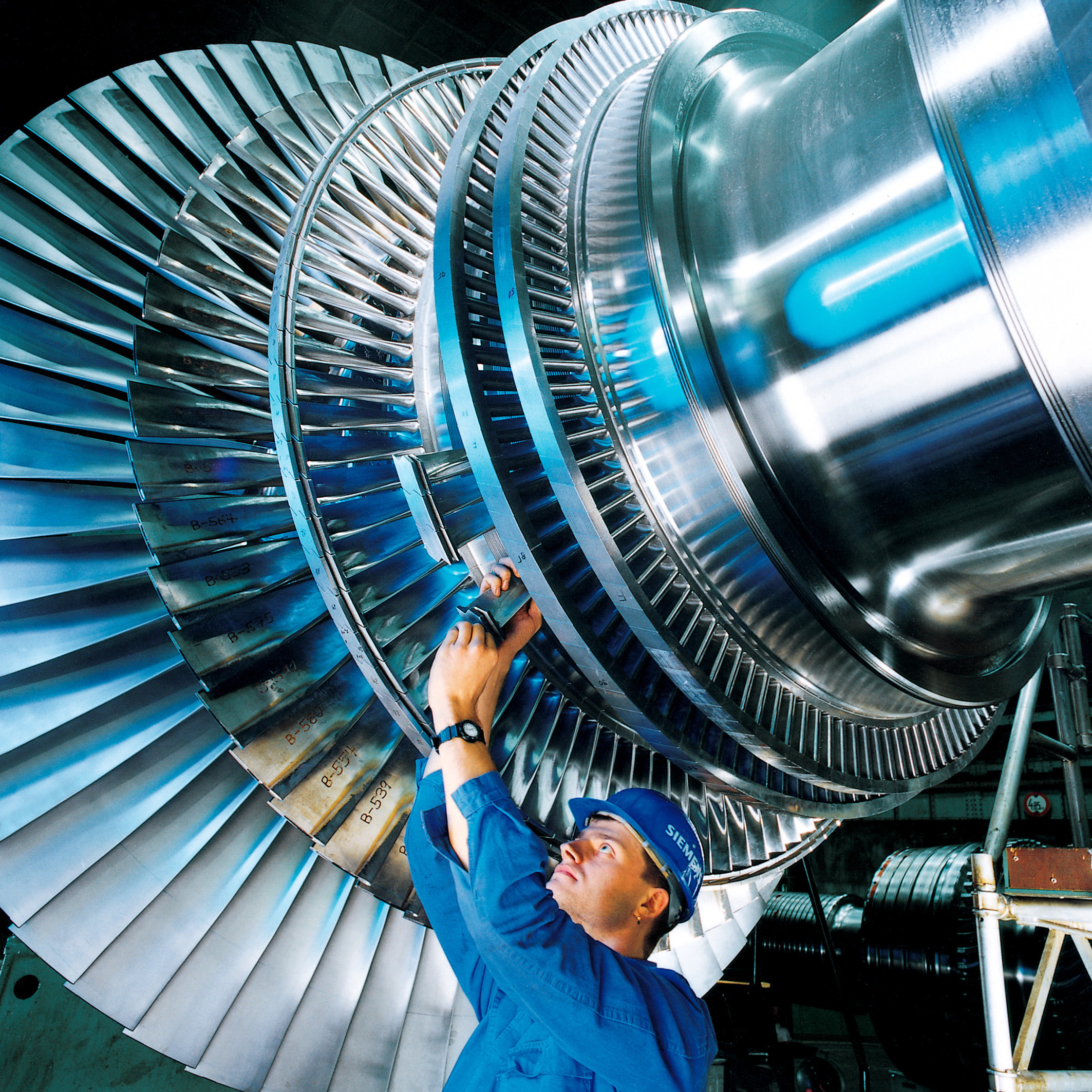
The rotor of a modern steam turbine

Consider a solid circular shaft transmitting 1000 megawatts at a rotational frequency of 50 hertz. Let the allowable shear stress initially be 250 MPa.

The angular frequency is

$$\omega=2\pi f,$$

and the transmitted torque is

$$T=\frac{P}{\omega}.$$

For $P=1.0\times10^9$ W and $f=50$ Hz, $\omega=314.16$ rad/s and $T\approx3.1831\times10^6$ N·m.

For a solid circular shaft,

$$J_\mathrm{T}=\frac{\pi D^4}{32}$$

and

$$\tau_{\max}=\frac{16T}{\pi D^3}.$$

Solving for the diameter gives

$$D=\left(\frac{16T}{\pi\tau_{\max}}\right)^{1/3}.$$

The resulting diameter is approximately 0.40 m. With a factor of safety of 5, so that the allowable stress is 50 MPa, the diameter increases to approximately 0.69 m.

== Failure modes ==
The shear stress in a shaft under pure torsion may be resolved into principal stresses using Mohr's circle. The principal tensile and compressive stresses act on planes oriented at approximately 45° to the shaft axis. Brittle materials may therefore fail along a helical fracture surface inclined at about 45°, as can be demonstrated by twisting a piece of chalk.

A ductile circular shaft may instead undergo substantial plastic shear deformation before fracture. Because an axisymmetric shaft can retain its overall external shape while accumulating permanent twist, overload damage may not be visually obvious.

Thin-walled hollow shafts may also fail by torsional buckling, producing diagonal wrinkles typically oriented at approximately 45° to the shaft axis.

== Torsional resonator ==
A torsional resonator uses rotational motion to investigate the elastic or viscoelastic behaviour of a fibre or other slender specimen. A typical system consists of a fibre fixed at one end and connected at the other end to a rigid rod or inertial mass. The deformation and damping of the fibre provide information about energy dissipation and viscoelasticity.

A simple rotational equation of motion is

$$T_\mathrm{ext}=K_t\theta+I\frac{\mathrm{d}^2\theta}{\mathrm{d}t^2},$$

where $T_\mathrm{ext}$ is the applied torque, $\theta$ is the angular displacement, $K_t$ is the torsional spring stiffness and $I$ is the rotational moment of inertia.

For a cylindrical fibre of diameter $d$ and length $l$,

$$K_t=\frac{\pi Gd^4}{32l}.$$

The undamped natural angular frequency is

$$\omega_n=\sqrt{\frac{K_t}{I}}.$$

For an ideal elastic material undergoing free undamped oscillation,

$$\theta=\theta_0\cos(\omega_n t).$$

Viscoelastic behaviour may be represented by a complex shear modulus

$$G^*=G'+iG'',$$

where $G'$ is the shear storage modulus and $G''$ is the shear loss modulus. The corresponding complex stiffness and frequency describe both the elastic response and damping.

Valtorta and Mazza used a torsional resonator device to measure the viscoelastic properties of soft tissue by characterising its complex shear modulus.

== See also ==
- List of area moments of inertia
- Saint-Venant's theorem
- Second moment of area
- Structural rigidity
- Torque tester
- Torsion siege engine
- Torsion spring or torsion bar
- Torsional vibration
