= Load =

Load or LOAD may refer to:

== Aeronautics and transportation ==
- Load factor (aeronautics), the ratio of the lift of an aircraft to its weight
- Passenger load factor, the ratio of revenue passenger miles to available seat miles of a particular transportation operation (e.g. a flight)

== Biology and medicine ==
- Afterload, the maximum effect of a heartbeat driving blood mass out of the heart into the aorta and pulmonary arteries
- Genetic load, of a population
- Late-onset Alzheimer's disease (acronym: LOAD), a chronic neurodegenerative disease
- Parasite load, of an organism
- Viral load, of organisms and populations

== Computing and electricity ==
- Load (computing), a measure of how much processing a computer performs
- Electrical load, a device connected to the output of a circuit
- Electronic load, a simulated electrical load used for testing purposes
- Invade-a-Load, was a fast loader routine used in software for the Commodore 64 computer; it was used in commercial computer games
- Load balancing (computing), or load distribution, a method that improves the distribution of workloads across multiple computing resources
- Load balancing (electrical power), or load distribution, the storing of excess electrical power by power stations during low demand periods, for release as demand rises
- Load cell, a transducer that is used to create an electrical signal
- Load factor (computer science), the ratio of the number of records to the number of addresses within a data structure
- Load factor (electrical), the average power divided by the peak power over a period of time
- Load file, the file used to import data into a database or to link images
- Load management, also known as demand side management (DSM), the process of balancing the supply of electricity on the network with the electrical load
- Load testing, the process of putting demand on a system and measuring its response

== Mechanics, construction, and architecture ==
- Add-on factor, or load factor, floor area, floor space, or floorspace, is the area (measured as square feet or square metres) taken up by a building or part of it
- Mechanical load, the external mechanical resistance against which a machine, such as a motor or engine, acts
- Structural load, forces which apply to a structure
- Wind load
- Moving load, this is the load that changes in time the place to which is applied

== Music ==
- Load Records, an American experimental independent record label
- Load (album), the 6th album released by the band Metallica
- Loads (album), a 1995 compilation of the British pop group Happy Mondays

== Places ==
- Load, Kentucky
- Load Brook, a hamlet in England

== Other uses ==
- The Load, a 2018 Serbian war film
- Cargo, paraphernalia being transported
- Factor loadings, in statistics, the exposure to specific factors or components in Factor Analysis or Principal Component Analysis
- Load fund, a mutual fund with a type of commission known as a load
- Load, a sexual slang term for semen
- Load, put cartridges into a firearm

== See also ==
- Loaded (disambiguation)
- Loader (disambiguation)
- Loading (disambiguation)
- Lod
- Lode
- Preload (disambiguation)
