= Loder =

Loder is a surname. Notable people with the surname include:

- Andrew Loder (1826–1900), Australian politician
- Anne Marie Loder (born 1969), Canadian actress
- Benjamin Loder (1801–1876), American businessman and railroad executive
- Bernard Loder (1849–1935), Dutch jurist
- Chris Loder (born 1981), British politician
- David Loder (born 1964), English racehorse trainer
- Edmund Giles Loder (1849–1920) Landowner and Plantsman
- Edward Loder (1809–1865), English composer and conductor
- George Loder (1816–1868), English composer and conductor, cousin of Edward
- Giles Rolls Loder (1914–1999) Horticulturalist
- Gerald Loder, 1st Baron Wakehurst (1861–1936), British barrister, businessman, and politician
- Jenna Loder (born 1988), Canadian curler
- John Loder (disambiguation), multiple people

- John Loder (actor) (1898–1988), British actor
- John Loder (landowner) (c.1726–1805), English clergyman, founder of the Old Berkshire Hunt
- John Loder (sound engineer) (1946–2005), English founder of Southern Studios
- John David Loder (1788–1846), English violinist
- John de Vere Loder (1895–1970), British politician

- Justus Christian Loder (1753–1832), German anatomist
- Kate Loder (1825–1904), English composer and pianist
- Kellie Loder (born 1988), Canadian musician
- Kevin Loder (born 1959), American basketball player
- Kurt Loder (born 1945), American television personality
- Loder Baronets, barons of Whittlebury and High Beeches in the UK
- Louis Loder (1896–1972), Australian public servant and policymaker
- Sir Robert Loder, 1st baronet (1823–1888), English politician
- Robert Beauclerk Loder (1934–2017), British businessman and art collector
- Roy Loder (1896–1964), Australian cricketer
- Terry Loder (born 1953), Canadian politician
- Thierry Loder (born 1975), Swiss-born French cyclist

== See also ==
- Loader (surname)
- 55772 Loder, an asteroid (1992 YB5)
- Loder Cup, New Zealand conservation award
- Loders (disambiguation)
- Loader (disambiguation)
