= Loading =

Loading may refer to:

== Biology ==
- Carbohydrate loading, a strategy employed by endurance athletes to maximize the storage of glycogen in the muscles
- Creatine loading, a phase of use of creatine supplements
- Vocal loading, the stress inflicted on the speech organs when speaking for long periods

== Engineering ==
- Application of a structural load to a system
  - Disk loading, the pressure maintained over the swept area of a helicopter's rotor
  - Seismic loading, one of the basic concepts of earthquake engineering
  - Wing loading, the loaded weight of an aircraft divided by the area of its wing
- Loading characteristic, a measure of traffic on a telephone system
- Insertion of an electrical load into a circuit
  - Use of a loading coil to increase inductance
- Loading (computing), the process in which the contents of a file are read into a computer's memory

== Other uses ==
- Task loading, the number of tasks taken on by a diver
- Loading (TV channel), a Brazilian TV Network focused on pop and geek culture

== See also ==
- Lading
- Load (disambiguation)
- Loaded (disambiguation)
- Loader (disambiguation)
