= Loaded =

Loaded may refer to:

== Music ==
- Loaded (The Velvet Underground album)
- Loaded (Brotha Lynch Hung album)
- Loaded (Busy Signal album)
- "Loaded" (Primal Scream song)
- "Loaded" (Deacon Blue song)
- "Loaded" (Ricky Martin song)
- "Loaded", a song by Dinosaur Jr. from the album Hand It Over, 1997
- "Loaded", a song by Bernie Miller
- Loaded Records, a record label
- Loaded (band), an American hard rock band formed by Guns N' Roses ex-bassist Duff McKagan

== Books ==
- Loaded: A Disarming History of the Second Amendment, a non-fiction study of the Second Amendment by Roxanne Dunbar-Ortiz
- Loaded (novel), the 1995 novel by Christos Tsiolkas

== Other uses ==
- Loaded (magazine), a British men's magazine
- Loaded (video game), a shooting game
- Loaded (American TV series), a music-video program
- Loaded (1994 film), a 1994 film starring Catherine McCormack
- Loaded (2008 film), a 2008 film directed by Alan Pao
- Loaded (British TV series), a British remake of the Israeli show Mesudarim

== See also ==
- Loaded dice made for cheating
- Loaded language, as in a "loaded question"
- Loaded baked potato, containing many ingredients
- Loader (disambiguation)
- Load (disambiguation)
- Loading (disambiguation)
