= Resistive force =

In physics, resistive force is a force, or the vector sum of numerous forces, whose direction is opposite to the motion of a body, and may refer to:

- Friction, during sliding and/or rolling
- Drag (physics), during movement through a fluid (see fluid dynamics)
- Normal force, exerted reactionally back on the acting body by the compressive, tensile or shear stress within the recipient body
- Intermolecular forces, when separating adhesively bonded surfaces
- Magnetic repulsion, when a magnetic object moves against another magnetic field
- Gravity, during vertical takeoff
- Mechanical load, in a simple machine
