= Locked and loaded =

Locked and loaded may refer to:

- Lock (firearm), locking and loading a firearm
- Locked and Loaded - The Covers Album, 2019 hard rock album by The Dead Daisies
- Locked and Loaded, production name for the 2005 crime drama film Get Rich or Die Tryin'
- Locked and Loaded, 2003 live rock album by Molly Hatchet
- Ratchet & Clank 2 Locked and Loaded, 2003 video game
- UFC 31: Locked and Loaded, 2001 Ultimate Fighting Championship event
- "Locked and Loaded", 1997 song by Jackyl

== See also ==
- Lock
- Load
