= 2013 Canadian Mixed Doubles Curling Trials =

- Host city: Leduc, Alberta
- Arena: Leduc Recreation Centre; Leduc Curling Club
- Dates: March 14–17
- Winner: (Quebec) Desjardins/Néron
- Curling club: CC Chicoutimi, Chicoutimi
- Female: Isabelle Néron
- Male: Robert Desjardins
- Finalist: (Saskatchewan) Dustin Kalthoff/Nancy Martin

The 2013 Canadian Mixed Doubles Curling Trials was held from March 14 to 17 at the Leduc Recreation Centre and the Leduc Curling Club in Leduc, Alberta. The winning team of the trials will represent Canada at the 2013 World Mixed Doubles Curling Championship. It is the first ever Canadian Mixed Doubles championship. Previously, two players from the Canadian Mixed Curling Championship winning team were selected to play at the World Mixed Doubles championship.

The various curling members associations scrambled to hold provincial qualifying tournaments. In addition to 12 provincial champion teams, 20 open entries were also invited to compete.

== Teams ==
The teams are listed as follows. Twelve teams qualified through provincial and territorial championships, and the rest will be participating as open entries.

=== Provincial and Territorial champions ===
Province / Territory	Male	Female	Club
New Brunswick	Avery Hughson	Shelby Wilson	Fredericton CC, Fredericton
Nova Scotia	Mark Dacey	Heather Smith-Dacey	Mayflower Curling Club, Halifax
Northwest Territories	Ian Moir	Marta Moir	Yellowknife Curling Club, Yellowknife
Quebec	Michel Briand	Genevieve Frappier	Club de curling Longue-Pointe, Montreal
Ontario	Scott McDonald	Jaclyn Rivington	Highland Country Club, London
Northern Ontario	Steve Chenier	Courtney Chenier	Idylwylde Golf & Country Club, Sudbury
Manitoba	Kelly Lauber	Kelsey Boettcher	Wildewood Club, Winnipeg
Saskatchewan	Mike Armstrong	Ashley Quick	Granite Curling Club, Saskatoon
Alberta	Jason Larence	Melanie Puzzie	Huntington Hills Curling Club, Calgary
British Columbia	Tyler Tardi	Dezaray Hawes	Langley Curling Club, Langley; Royal City Curling Club, New Westminster
Yukon	Bob Smallwood	Jody Smallwood	Whitehorse Curling Club, Whitehorse
Newfoundland and Labrador	Jamie Danbrook	Erin Porter	St. John's Curling Club, St. John's

=== Open entries ===
Province / Territory	Male	Female
Saskatchewan	Dustin Kalthoff	Nancy Martin
Alberta; British Columbia	Matthew Blandford	Darah Provencal
Saskatchewan	Dean Hicke	Chantelle Eberle
Quebec	Robert Desjardins	Isabelle Néron
Saskatchewan	Jason Ackerman	Colleen Ackerman
Saskatchewan	Derek Owens	Danielle Sicinski
Saskatchewan	Bob Ziegler	Barb Cressman
Newfoundland and Labrador	Stephen Shepherd	Donna Davis
Manitoba	Sean Grassie	Karen Klein
Saskatchewan; Manitoba	Joshua Heidt	Jenna Loder
Saskatchewan; Alberta	Chris Schille	Erin Carmody
British Columbia	Norm Richard	Debbie Girard
Alberta	Kyle Leach	Cori Dunbar
British Columbia	Ernie Daniels	Sarah Daniels
Saskatchewan	Matt Lang	Jessica Hanson
Yukon	Mitch Young	Chelsea Duncan
Alberta	Lyle Walker	Kristen Walker
Saskatchewan	Cole Tenetuik	Alison Ingram
Alberta	Deryk Kuny	Erica Ortt
Alberta	Dale Parker	Janice Parker

== Round-robin standings ==
Final round-robin standings

Key
Teams to Playoffs

Pool A	W	L
(Ontario) McDonald/Rivington	7	0
(Saskatchewan) Kalthoff/Martin	6	1
(Nova Scotia) Dacey/Smith-Dacey	4	3
(Saskatchewan) Lang/Hanson	3	4
(New Brunswick) Hughson/Wilson	3	4
(British Columbia) Daniels/Daniels	3	4
(Quebec) Briand/Frappier	2	5
(British Columbia) Richard/Girard	0	7

Pool B	W	L
(Saskatchewan) Hicke/Eberle	7	0
(Yukon) Young/Duncan	6	1
(Saskatchewan) (Manitoba) Heidt/Loder	4	3
(Newfoundland and Labrador) Danbrook/Porter	3	4
(Saskatchewan) Tenetuik/Ingram	3	4
(Alberta) Larence/Puzzie	2	5
(Saskatchewan) Owens/Sicinski	2	5
(Northwest Territories) Moir/Moir	1	6

Pool C	W	L
(Manitoba) Grassie/Klein	6	1
(Saskatchewan) Ackerman/Ackerman	5	2
(Manitoba) Lauber/Boettcher	4	3
(British Columbia) Tardi/Hawes	4	3
(Alberta) (British Columbia) Blandford/Provençal	4	3
(Alberta) Parker/Parker	3	4
(Alberta) Leach/Dunbar	1	6
(Alberta) Walker/Walker	1	6

Pool D	W	L
(Saskatchewan) Armstrong/Quick	5	2
(Saskatchewan) (Alberta) Schille/Carmody	5	2
(Quebec) Desjardins/Néron	4	3
(Yukon) Smallwood/Smallwood	4	3
(Newfoundland and Labrador) Shepherd/Davis	4	3
(Ontario) Chenier/Chenier	2	5
(Alberta) Kuny/Ortt	2	5
(Saskatchewan) Ziegler/Cressman	2	5

== Round-robin results ==
All draw times are listed in Mountain Daylight Time (UTC−6).

=== Draw 1 ===
Thursday, March 14, 1:30 pm

Sheet 1	1	2	3	4	5	6	7	8	Final
(Saskatchewan) Lang/Hanson	2	0	0	1	0	2	1	0	6
(Saskatchewan) Kalthoff/Martin	0	1	2	0	2	0	0	3	8

Sheet 2	1	2	3	4	5	6	7	8	9	Final
(New Brunswick) Hughson/Wilson	2	0	0	0	1	0	0	2	0	5
(Ontario) McDonald/Rivington	0	1	0	1	0	2	1	0	2	7

Sheet 3	1	2	3	4	5	6	7	8	Final
(British Columbia) Richard/Girard	2	0	0	0	0	1	0	X	3
(Nova Scotia) Dacey/Smith-Dacey	0	2	1	2	3	0	3	X	11

Sheet 4	1	2	3	4	5	6	7	8	9	Final
(Quebec) Briand/Frappier	2	0	1	2	0	0	0	0	1	6
(British Columbia) Daniels/Daniels	0	1	0	0	1	1	1	1	0	5

Sheet 5	1	2	3	4	5	6	7	8	Final
(Saskatchewan) Owens/Sicinski	1	0	0	1	0	2	0	0	4
(Saskatchewan) Tenetuik/Ingram	0	1	1	0	1	0	1	2	6

Sheet 6	1	2	3	4	5	6	7	8	Final
(Alberta) Larence/Puzzie	0	1	3	1	1	0	1	2	9
(Newfoundland and Labrador) Danbrook/Porter	1	0	0	0	0	2	0	0	3

Sheet 7	1	2	3	4	5	6	7	8	9	Final
(Yukon) Young/Duncan	0	1	2	0	0	3	0	0	0	6
(Saskatchewan) Hicke/Eberle	2	0	0	1	1	0	1	1	2	8

Sheet 8	1	2	3	4	5	6	7	8	Final
(Saskatchewan) (Manitoba) Heidt/Loder	1	0	3	0	6	5	0	X	15
(Northwest Territories) Moir/Moir	0	3	0	2	0	0	0	X	5

=== Draw 2 ===
Thursday, March 14, 4:00 pm

Sheet 1	1	2	3	4	5	6	7	8	Final
(Alberta) (British Columbia) Blandford/Provencal	1	0	1	1	2	3	0	1	9
(Alberta) Parker/Parker	0	1	0	0	0	0	1	0	2

Sheet 2	1	2	3	4	5	6	7	8	Final
(British Columbia) Tardi/Hawes	1	0	0	0	3	1	0	2	7
(Alberta) Leach/Dunbar	0	2	2	1	0	0	1	0	6

Sheet 3	1	2	3	4	5	6	7	8	Final
(Alberta) Walker/Walker	0	3	0	0	1	0	2	0	6
(Manitoba) Grassie/Klein	3	0	1	3	0	3	0	0	10

Sheet 4	1	2	3	4	5	6	7	8	Final
(Saskatchewan) Ackerman/Ackerman	1	0	1	0	4	0	2	X	8
(Manitoba) Lauber/Boettcher	0	1	0	1	0	1	0	X	3

Sheet 5	1	2	3	4	5	6	7	8	Final
(Ontario) Chenier/Chenier	0	0	0	2	0	0	X	X	2
(Saskatchewan) Ziegler/Cressman	3	2	2	0	3	1	X	X	11

Sheet 6	1	2	3	4	5	6	7	8	Final
(Yukon) Smallwood/Smallwood	3	0	0	0	2	0	2	0	7
(Newfoundland and Labrador) Shepherd/Davis	0	1	1	2	0	2	0	2	8

Sheet 7	1	2	3	4	5	6	7	8	Final
(Alberta) Kuny/Ortt	0	0	2	0	2	1	0	1	6
(Saskatchewan) (Alberta) Schille/Carmody	2	1	0	2	0	0	2	0	7

Sheet 8	1	2	3	4	5	6	7	8	Final
(Quebec) Desjardins/Néron	0	0	1	2	1	0	3	X	7
(Saskatchewan) Armstrong/Quick	2	1	0	0	0	1	0	X	4

=== Draw 3 ===
Thursday, March 14, 6:30 pm

Sheet 1	1	2	3	4	5	6	7	8	Final
(New Brunswick) Hughson/Wilson	0	1	0	0	0	0	1	X	2
(Nova Scotia) Dacey/Smith-Dacey	2	0	1	1	1	1	0	X	6

Sheet 2	1	2	3	4	5	6	7	8	Final
(Saskatchewan) Lang/Hanson	0	1	1	0	0	1	1	1	5
(British Columbia) Daniels/Daniels	4	0	0	1	1	0	0	0	6

Sheet 3	1	2	3	4	5	6	7	8	Final
(Quebec) Briand/Frappier	1	0	1	0	1	1	0	0	4
(Saskatchewan) Kalthoff/Martin	0	1	0	2	0	0	3	1	7

Sheet 4	1	2	3	4	5	6	7	8	Final
(British Columbia) Richard/Girard	0	0	0	0	1	0	X	X	1
(Ontario) McDonald/Rivington	3	1	3	2	0	0	X	X	9

Sheet 5	1	2	3	4	5	6	7	8	9	Final
(Alberta) Larence/Puzzie	0	2	0	1	0	1	2	0	0	6
(Saskatchewan) Hicke/Eberle	2	0	2	0	1	0	0	1	1	7

Sheet 6	1	2	3	4	5	6	7	8	Final
(Saskatchewan) Owens/Sicinski	0	0	1	2	1	0	0	1	5
(Northwest Territories) Moir/Moir	3	1	0	0	0	1	1	0	6

Sheet 7	1	2	3	4	5	6	7	8	Final
(Saskatchewan) (Manitoba) Heidt/Loder	1	2	0	0	0	3	0	2	8
(Saskatchewan) Tenetuik/Ingram	0	0	1	3	1	0	1	0	6

Sheet 8	1	2	3	4	5	6	7	8	Final
(Yukon) Young/Duncan	0	3	1	1	2	0	X	X	7
(Newfoundland and Labrador) Danbrook/Porter	1	0	0	0	0	1	X	X	2

=== Draw 4 ===
Thursday, March 14, 9:00 pm

Sheet 1	1	2	3	4	5	6	7	8	Final
(British Columbia) Tardi/Hawes	2	0	4	2	0	0	0	0	8
(Manitoba) Grassie/Klein	0	1	0	0	1	1	1	0	4

Sheet 2	1	2	3	4	5	6	7	8	Final
(Alberta) (British Columbia) Blandford/Provencal	1	0	0	0	4	0	2	0	7
(Manitoba) Lauber/Boettcher	0	3	0	2	0	1	0	2	8

Sheet 3	1	2	3	4	5	6	7	8	Final
(Saskatchewan) Ackerman/Ackerman	1	0	5	2	0	2	X	X	10
(Alberta) Parker/Parker	0	2	0	0	1	0	X	X	3

Sheet 4	1	2	3	4	5	6	7	8	Final
(Alberta) Walker/Walker	0	0	0	0	0	1	X	X	1
(Alberta) Leach/Dunbar	2	2	3	1	1	0	X	X	9

Sheet 5	1	2	3	4	5	6	7	8	Final
(Yukon) Smallwood/Smallwood	0	0	1	0	1	0	1	X	3
(Saskatchewan) (Alberta) Schille/Carmody	2	2	0	2	0	2	0	X	8

Sheet 6	1	2	3	4	5	6	7	8	Final
(Ontario) Chenier/Chenier	1	0	0	0	0	3	1	0	5
(Saskatchewan) Armstrong/Quick	0	1	1	1	1	0	0	2	6

Sheet 7	1	2	3	4	5	6	7	8	9	Final
(Quebec) Desjardins/Néron	3	0	1	0	0	0	0	3	1	8
(Saskatchewan) Ziegler/Cressman	0	1	0	1	2	1	2	0	0	7

Sheet 8	1	2	3	4	5	6	7	8	Final
(Alberta) Kuny/Ortt	0	2	0	2	0	2	1	0	7
(Newfoundland and Labrador) Shepherd/Davis	3	0	3	0	1	0	0	2	9

=== Draw 5 ===
Friday, March 15, 9:00 am

Sheet 1	1	2	3	4	5	6	7	8	Final
(Quebec) Briand/Frappier	1	2	0	1	3	0	0	X	7
(British Columbia) Richard/Girard	0	0	1	0	0	1	1	X	3

Sheet 2	1	2	3	4	5	6	7	8	Final
(Saskatchewan) Kalthoff/Martin	0	1	1	1	0	0	0	2	5
(Nova Scotia) Dacey/Smith-Dacey	1	0	0	0	1	1	1	0	4

Sheet 3	1	2	3	4	5	6	7	8	Final
(British Columbia) Daniels/Daniels	0	0	1	0	0	1	X	X	2
(Ontario) McDonald/Rivington	1	3	0	1	2	0	X	X	7

Sheet 4	1	2	3	4	5	6	7	8	Final
(Saskatchewan) Lang/Hanson	1	0	0	3	0	0	2	1	7
(New Brunswick) Hughson/Wilson	0	1	1	0	2	1	0	0	5

Sheet 5	1	2	3	4	5	6	7	8	Final
(Saskatchewan) (Manitoba) Heidt/Loder	0	0	0	4	0	0	1	0	5
(Yukon) Young/Duncan	3	0	1	0	2	1	0	2	9

Sheet 6	1	2	3	4	5	6	7	8	Final
(Saskatchewan) Tenetuik/Ingram	2	0	1	0	0	1	0	1	5
(Saskatchewan) Hicke/Eberle	0	1	0	4	1	0	1	0	7

Sheet 7	1	2	3	4	5	6	7	8	Final
(Northwest Territories) Moir/Moir	0	0	5	0	0	0	0	X	5
(Newfoundland and Labrador) Danbrook/Porter	3	2	0	1	3	1	2	X	12

Sheet 8	1	2	3	4	5	6	7	8	Final
(Saskatchewan) Owens/Sicinski	1	2	0	4	2	0	X	X	9
(Alberta) Larence/Puzzie	0	0	2	0	0	1	0	X	3

=== Draw 6 ===
Friday, March 15, 11:30 am

Sheet 1	1	2	3	4	5	6	7	8	Final
(Saskatchewan) Ackerman/Ackerman	1	2	2	1	0	1	X	X	7
(Alberta) Walker/Walker	0	0	0	0	1	0	X	X	1

Sheet 2	1	2	3	4	5	6	7	8	Final
(Alberta) Parker/Parker	0	2	0	0	1	0	3	0	6
(Manitoba) Grassie/Klein	1	0	1	1	0	2	0	2	7

Sheet 3	1	2	3	4	5	6	7	8	Final
(Manitoba) Lauber/Boettcher	1	1	1	0	1	2	1	X	7
(Alberta) Leach/Dunbar	0	0	0	1	0	0	0	X	1

Sheet 4	1	2	3	4	5	6	7	8	Final
(Alberta) (British Columbia) Blandford/Provencal	0	2	2	0	0	1	0	3	8
(British Columbia) Tardi/Hawes	1	0	0	3	1	0	2	0	7

Sheet 5	1	2	3	4	5	6	7	8	Final
(Quebec) Desjardins/Néron	0	1	0	3	0	3	0	1	8
(Alberta) Kuny/Ortt	2	0	2	0	1	0	2	0	7

Sheet 6	1	2	3	4	5	6	7	8	Final
(Saskatchewan) Ziegler/Cressman	1	0	4	3	1	2	X	X	11
(Saskatchewan) (Alberta) Schille/Carmody	0	1	0	0	0	0	X	X	1

Sheet 7	1	2	3	4	5	6	7	8	Final
(Saskatchewan) Armstrong/Quick	4	1	0	0	4	1	X	X	10
(Newfoundland and Labrador) Shepherd/Davis	0	0	1	1	0	0	X	X	2

Sheet 8	1	2	3	4	5	6	7	8	Final
(Ontario) Chenier/Chenier	1	2	1	0	1	0	2	0	7
(Yukon) Smallwood/Smallwood	0	0	0	2	0	1	0	5	8

=== Draw 7 ===
Friday, March 15, 2:00 pm

Sheet 1	1	2	3	4	5	6	7	8	Final
(Saskatchewan) Hicke/Eberle	1	1	0	0	2	2	0	1	7
(Newfoundland and Labrador) Danbrook/Porter	0	0	3	1	0	0	2	0	6

Sheet 2	1	2	3	4	5	6	7	8	Final
(Saskatchewan) (Manitoba) Heidt/Loder	0	2	0	0	2	0	4	0	8
(Saskatchewan) Owens/Sicinski	1	0	1	1	0	1	0	0	4

Sheet 3	1	2	3	4	5	6	7	8	Final
(Alberta) Larence/Puzzie	1	0	2	0	0	0	2	0	5
(Yukon) Young/Duncan	0	1	0	1	3	1	0	1	7

Sheet 4	1	2	3	4	5	6	7	8	Final
(Northwest Territories) Moir/Moir	0	0	3	0	2	0	1	0	6
(Saskatchewan) Tenetuik/Ingram	1	2	0	3	0	3	0	0	9

Sheet 5	1	2	3	4	5	6	7	8	Final
(Nova Scotia) Dacey/Smith-Dacey	0	0	0	2	1	0	X	X	3
(Ontario) McDonald/Rivington	3	4	1	0	0	0	X	X	8

Sheet 6	1	2	3	4	5	6	7	8	9	Final
(Quebec) Briand/Frappier	1	0	0	2	0	2	0	2	0	7
(Saskatchewan) Lang/Hanson	0	2	1	0	1	0	3	0	1	8

Sheet 7	1	2	3	4	5	6	7	8	Final
(New Brunswick) Hughson/Wilson	1	0	5	1	0	3	X	X	10
(British Columbia) Richard/Girard	0	1	0	0	2	0	X	X	3

Sheet 8	1	2	3	4	5	6	7	8	Final
(British Columbia) Daniels/Daniels	0	0	0	0	1	0	X	X	1
(Saskatchewan) Kalthoff/Martin	3	1	1	2	0	1	X	X	8

=== Draw 8 ===
Friday, March 15, 4:30 pm

Sheet 1	1	2	3	4	5	6	7	8	Final
(Saskatchewan) (Alberta) Schille/Carmody	3	1	0	3	1	0	1	X	9
(Newfoundland and Labrador) Shepherd/Davis	0	0	1	0	0	2	0	X	3

Sheet 2	1	2	3	4	5	6	7	8	Final
(Quebec) Desjardins/Néron	1	0	3	0	0	1	0	1	6
(Ontario) Chenier/Chenier	0	1	0	1	2	0	1	0	5

Sheet 3	1	2	3	4	5	6	7	8	Final
(Yukon) Smallwood/Smallwood	1	0	0	3	2	1	0	0	7
(Alberta) Kuny/Ortt	0	4	2	0	0	0	1	1	8

Sheet 4	1	2	3	4	5	6	7	8	Final
(Saskatchewan) Armstrong/Quick	1	2	0	1	1	0	1	0	6
(Saskatchewan) Ziegler/Cressman	0	0	1	0	0	1	0	0	2

Sheet 5	1	2	3	4	5	6	7	8	Final
(Manitoba) Grassie/Klein	3	1	0	0	3	1	1	0	9
(Alberta) Leach/Dunbar	0	0	2	2	0	0	0	1	5

Sheet 6	1	2	3	4	5	6	7	8	Final
(Saskatchewan) Ackerman/Ackerman	0	1	1	0	1	3	0	3	9
(Alberta) (British Columbia) Blandford/Provencal	1	0	0	1	0	0	3	0	5

Sheet 7	1	2	3	4	5	6	7	8	Final
(British Columbia) Tardi/Hawes	0	1	3	0	1	0	2	0	7
(Alberta) Walker/Walker	1	0	0	1	0	3	0	0	5

Sheet 8	1	2	3	4	5	6	7	8	Final
(Manitoba) Lauber/Boettcher	1	0	1	0	2	0	0	X	4
(Alberta) Parker/Parker	0	1	0	3	0	3	2	X	9

=== Draw 9 ===
Friday, March 15, 7:00 pm

Sheet 1	1	2	3	4	5	6	7	8	Final
(Yukon) Young/Duncan	3	1	0	4	2	0	0	X	10
(Saskatchewan) Owens/Sicinski	0	0	1	0	0	4	0	X	5

Sheet 2	1	2	3	4	5	6	7	8	Final
(Newfoundland and Labrador) Danbrook/Porter	0	3	0	3	0	4	0	3	13
(Saskatchewan) Tenetuik/Ingram	2	0	4	0	2	0	2	0	10

Sheet 3	1	2	3	4	5	6	7	8	Final
(Saskatchewan) Hicke/Eberle	4	0	0	1	2	1	X	X	8
(Northwest Territories) Moir/Moir	0	1	1	0	0	0	X	X	2

Sheet 4	1	2	3	4	5	6	7	8	Final
(Alberta) Larence/Puzzie	1	0	0	0	1	0	1	X	3
(Saskatchewan) (Manitoba) Heidt/Loder	0	3	1	1	0	2	0	X	7

Sheet 5	1	2	3	4	5	6	7	8	Final
(British Columbia) Richard/Girard	2	0	2	0	0	0	X	X	4
(Saskatchewan) Lang/Hanson	0	4	0	2	1	2	X	X	9

Sheet 6	1	2	3	4	5	6	7	8	Final
(Ontario) McDonald/Rivington	2	2	2	0	2	1	X	X	9
(Saskatchewan) Kalthoff/Martin	0	0	0	2	0	0	X	X	2

Sheet 7	1	2	3	4	5	6	7	8	Final
(Nova Scotia) Dacey/Smith-Dacey	1	0	0	0	0	1	1	1	4
(British Columbia) Daniels/Daniels	0	1	1	1	2	0	0	0	5

Sheet 8	1	2	3	4	5	6	7	8	Final
(New Brunswick) Hughson/Wilson	0	3	1	1	2	0	0	X	7
(Quebec) Briand/Frappier	1	0	0	0	0	1	3	X	5

=== Draw 10 ===
Friday, March 15, 9:30 pm

Sheet 1	1	2	3	4	5	6	7	8	Final
(Alberta) Kuny/Ortt	0	0	0	1	2	0	2	0	5
(Ontario) Chenier/Chenier	1	2	1	0	0	0	0	2	6

Sheet 2	1	2	3	4	5	6	7	8	Final
(Newfoundland and Labrador) Shepherd/Davis	2	0	0	3	0	1	0	0	6
(Saskatchewan) Ziegler/Cressman	0	1	1	0	1	0	1	0	4

Sheet 3	1	2	3	4	5	6	7	8	Final
(Saskatchewan) (Alberta) Schille/Carmody	1	0	1	0	1	1	0	1	5
(Saskatchewan) Armstrong/Quick	0	1	0	3	0	0	2	0	6

Sheet 4	1	2	3	4	5	6	7	8	9	Final
(Yukon) Smallwood/Smallwood	0	2	1	0	0	1	2	0	1	7
(Quebec) Desjardins/Néron	2	0	0	2	1	0	0	1	0	6

Sheet 5	1	2	3	4	5	6	7	8	Final
(Alberta) Walker/Walker	0	0	1	0	3	0	0	0	4
(Alberta) (British Columbia) Blandford/Provencal	3	1	0	3	0	1	1	1	10

Sheet 6	1	2	3	4	5	6	7	8	9	Final
(Alberta) Leach/Dunbar	1	0	5	0	1	0	0	1	0	8
(Alberta) Parker/Parker	0	2	0	2	0	3	1	0	3	11

Sheet 7	1	2	3	4	5	6	7	8	Final
(Manitoba) Grassie/Klein	0	3	2	1	0	1	0	1	8
(Manitoba) Lauber/Boettcher	1	0	0	0	4	0	1	0	6

Sheet 8	1	2	3	4	5	6	7	8	Final
(British Columbia) Tardi/Hawes	2	1	0	4	0	0	2	0	9
(Saskatchewan) Ackerman/Ackerman	0	0	2	0	2	1	0	2	7

=== Draw 11 ===
Saturday, March 16, 9:00 am

Sheet 1	1	2	3	4	5	6	7	8	Final
(Newfoundland and Labrador) Danbrook/Porter	0	0	0	2	1	1	1	2	7
(Saskatchewan) (Manitoba) Heidt/Loder	2	1	1	0	0	0	0	0	4

Sheet 2	1	2	3	4	5	6	7	8	Final
(Northwest Territories) Moir/Moir	0	0	1	0	0	0	X	X	1
(Yukon) Young/Duncan	2	1	0	2	1	2	X	X	8

Sheet 3	1	2	3	4	5	6	7	8	Final
(Saskatchewan) Tenetuik/Ingram	5	0	2	0	2	0	0	X	9
(Alberta) Larence/Puzzie	0	2	0	1	0	3	1	X	7

Sheet 4	1	2	3	4	5	6	7	8	Final
(Saskatchewan) Hicke/Eberle	2	1	1	0	2	0	0	0	6
(Saskatchewan) Owens/Sicinski	0	0	0	1	0	1	1	0	3

Sheet 5	1	2	3	4	5	6	7	8	Final
(Ontario) McDonald/Rivington	0	2	1	2	0	0	3	X	8
(Quebec) Briand/Frappier	2	0	0	0	3	1	0	X	6

Sheet 6	1	2	3	4	5	6	7	8	Final
(British Columbia) Daniels/Daniels	3	2	1	0	2	0	1	X	9
(British Columbia) Richard/Girard	0	0	0	2	0	1	0	X	3

Sheet 7	1	2	3	4	5	6	7	8	Final
(Saskatchewan) Kalthoff/Martin	1	0	1	3	1	1	X	X	7
(New Brunswick) Hughson/Wilson	0	2	0	0	0	0	X	X	2

Sheet 8	1	2	3	4	5	6	7	8	Final
(Nova Scotia) Dacey/Smith-Dacey	0	1	1	0	2	1	1	X	6
(Saskatchewan) Lang/Hanson	1	0	0	1	0	0	0	X	2

=== Draw 12 ===
Saturday, March 16, 11:30 am

Sheet 1	1	2	3	4	5	6	7	8	Final
(Newfoundland and Labrador) Shepherd/Davis	1	0	0	1	1	1	0	3	7
(Quebec) Desjardins/Néron	0	1	1	0	0	0	2	0	4

Sheet 2	1	2	3	4	5	6	7	8	Final
(Saskatchewan) Armstrong/Quick	3	0	1	1	0	4	1	0	10
(Alberta) Kuny/Ortt	0	0	0	0	4	0	0	2	6

Sheet 3	1	2	3	4	5	6	7	8	Final
(Saskatchewan) Ziegler/Cressman	0	1	0	0	1	0	X	X	2
(Yukon) Smallwood/Smallwood	3	0	1	1	0	4	X	X	9

Sheet 4	1	2	3	4	5	6	7	8	Final
(Saskatchewan) (Alberta) Schille/Carmody	1	1	0	0	2	1	3	X	8
(Ontario) Chenier/Chenier	0	0	1	1	0	0	0	X	2

Sheet 5	1	2	3	4	5	6	7	8	Final
(Alberta) Leach/Dunbar	0	0	3	1	0	0	1	X	5
(Saskatchewan) Ackerman/Ackerman	1	2	0	0	5	1	0	X	9

Sheet 6	1	2	3	4	5	6	7	8	9	Final
(Manitoba) Lauber/Boettcher	0	4	0	0	3	0	0	1	2	10
(Alberta) Walker/Walker	2	0	2	1	0	2	1	0	0	8

Sheet 7	1	2	3	4	5	6	7	8	Final
(Alberta) Parker/Parker	0	2	0	3	1	1	0	0	7
(British Columbia) Tardi/Hawes	1	0	3	0	0	0	1	0	5

Sheet 8	1	2	3	4	5	6	7	8	Final
(Manitoba) Grassie/Klein	0	1	3	1	0	0	0	1	6
(Alberta) (British Columbia) Blandford/Provencal	1	0	0	0	1	1	1	0	4

=== Draw 13 ===
Saturday, March 16, 2:00 pm

Sheet 1	1	2	3	4	5	6	7	8	Final
(British Columbia) Daniels/Daniels	0	0	1	1	0	0	X	X	2
(New Brunswick) Hughson/Wilson	3	2	0	0	1	1	X	X	7

Sheet 2	1	2	3	4	5	6	7	8	Final
(Ontario) McDonald/Rivington	0	1	0	5	1	2	0	X	9
(Saskatchewan) Lang/Hanson	2	0	2	0	0	0	2	X	6

Sheet 3	1	2	3	4	5	6	7	8	Final
(Nova Scotia) Dacey/Smith-Dacey	4	0	1	0	3	2	X	X	10
(Quebec) Briand/Frappier	0	1	0	1	0	0	X	X	2

Sheet 4	1	2	3	4	5	6	7	8	Final
(Saskatchewan) Kalthoff/Martin	2	1	1	1	2	0	2	X	9
(British Columbia) Richard/Girard	0	0	0	0	0	4	0	X	4

Sheet 5	1	2	3	4	5	6	7	8	Final
(Northwest Territories) Moir/Moir	0	0	0	0	0	1	X	X	1
(Alberta) Larence/Puzzie	5	1	1	3	2	0	X	X	12

Sheet 6	1	2	3	4	5	6	7	8	9	Final
(Newfoundland and Labrador) Danbrook/Porter	0	0	0	4	0	3	0	0	0	7
(Saskatchewan) Owens/Sicinski	1	1	1	0	1	0	2	1	1	8

Sheet 7	1	2	3	4	5	6	7	8	Final
(Saskatchewan) Hicke/Eberle	0	0	1	2	1	0	2	3	9
(Saskatchewan) (Manitoba) Heidt/Loder	2	1	0	0	0	2	0	0	5

Sheet 8	1	2	3	4	5	6	7	8	Final
(Saskatchewan) Tenetuik/Ingram	2	0	0	2	0	0	0	0	4
(Yukon) Young/Duncan	0	1	1	0	2	1	2	2	9

=== Draw 14 ===
Saturday, March 16, 4:30 pm

Sheet 1	1	2	3	4	5	6	7	8	Final
(Manitoba) Lauber/Boettcher	2	0	1	2	1	0	1	0	7
(British Columbia) Tardi/Hawes	0	2	0	0	0	2	0	1	5

Sheet 2	1	2	3	4	5	6	7	8	9	Final
(Alberta) Leach/Dunbar	0	2	0	2	1	0	0	1	0	6
(Alberta) (British Columbia) Blandford/Provencal	1	0	1	0	0	1	3	0	1	7

Sheet 3	1	2	3	4	5	6	7	8	Final
(Manitoba) Grassie/Klein	0	3	0	1	0	4	X	X	8
(Saskatchewan) Ackerman/Ackerman	1	0	1	0	1	0	X	X	3

Sheet 4	1	2	3	4	5	6	7	8	9	Final
(Alberta) Parker/Parker	0	1	0	1	1	0	1	0	0	4
(Alberta) Walker/Walker	1	0	1	0	0	1	0	1	1	5

Sheet 5	1	2	3	4	5	6	7	8	Final
(Saskatchewan) Armstrong/Quick	0	0	0	0	3	0	2	0	5
(Yukon) Smallwood/Smallwood	2	1	3	1	0	1	0	1	9

Sheet 6	1	2	3	4	5	6	7	8	Final
(Newfoundland and Labrador) Shepherd/Davis	0	0	2	0	0	1	0	X	3
(Ontario) Chenier/Chenier	1	2	0	2	1	0	3	X	9

Sheet 7	1	2	3	4	5	6	7	8	9	Final
(Saskatchewan) (Alberta) Schille/Carmody	3	0	4	0	1	0	1	0	1	10
(Quebec) Desjardins/Néron	0	2	0	1	0	3	0	3	0	9

Sheet 8	1	2	3	4	5	6	7	8	Final
(Saskatchewan) Ziegler/Cressman	0	0	0	0	1	0	X	X	1
(Alberta) Kuny/Ortt	3	1	1	1	0	3	X	X	9

== Playoffs ==
Round of 12
(Quebec) Desjardins/Neron	11
(Saskatchewan) (Alberta) Schille/Carmody	4
(Yukon) Young/Duncan	3
(Nova Scotia) Dacey/Smith-Dacey	9
(Yukon) Smallwood/Smallwood	10
(Saskatchewan) Ackerman/Ackerman	5
(Saskatchewan) Kalthoff/Martin	9
(Manitoba) Lauber/Boettcher	6

Quarterfinals
(Quebec) Desjardins/Néron	11
(Ontario) McDonald/Rivington	10
(Nova Scotia) Dacey/Smith-Dacey	7
(Manitoba) Grassie/Klein	2
(Yukon) Smallwood/Smallwood	7
(Saskatchewan) Hicke/Eberle	8
(Saskatchewan) Kalthoff/Martin	8
(Saskatchewan) Armstrong/Quick	5

Semifinals
(Quebec) Desjardins/Néron	7
(Nova Scotia) Dacey/Smith-Dacey	6
(Saskatchewan) Hicke/Eberle	6
(Saskatchewan) Kalthoff/Martin	7

Final
(Quebec) Desjardins/Néron	7
(Saskatchewan) Kalthoff/Martin	3

=== Round of 12 ===
Saturday, March 16, 8:30 pm

Sheet 2	1	2	3	4	5	6	7	8	Final
(Quebec) Desjardins/Neron	4	0	4	0	3	X	X	X	11
(Saskatchewan) (Alberta) Schille/Carmody	0	3	0	1	0	X	X	X	4

Sheet 6	1	2	3	4	5	6	7	8	Final
(Yukon) Smallwood/Smallwood	1	0	2	1	0	0	6	X	10
(Saskatchewan) Ackerman/Ackerman	0	2	0	0	2	1	0	X	5

Sheet 5	1	2	3	4	5	6	7	8	Final
(Yukon) Young/Duncan	1	0	0	2	0	0	0	X	3
(Nova Scotia) Dacey/Smith-Dacey	0	1	1	0	4	1	2	X	9

Sheet 7	1	2	3	4	5	6	7	8	Final
(Saskatchewan) Kalthoff/Martin	0	4	2	2	0	1	0	X	9
(Manitoba) Lauber/Boettcher	4	0	0	0	1	0	1	X	6

=== Quarterfinals ===
Sunday, March 17, 10:00 am

Sheet 3	1	2	3	4	5	6	7	8	Final
(Quebec) Desjardins/Neron	0	3	0	0	4	0	3	1	11
(Ontario) McDonald/Rivington	1	0	3	3	0	3	0	0	10

Team	1	2	3	4	5	6	7	8	Final
(Nova Scotia) Dacey/Smith-Dacey	3	0	2	1	1	0	X	X	7
(Manitoba) Grassie/Klein	0	1	0	0	0	1	X	X	2

Team	1	2	3	4	5	6	7	8	Final
(Yukon) Smallwood/Smallwood	0	3	2	0	0	1	1	0	7
(Saskatchewan) Hicke/Eberle	3	0	0	2	1	0	0	2	8

Team	1	2	3	4	5	6	7	8	Final
(Saskatchewan) Kalthoff/Martin	0	2	0	2	0	2	0	2	8
(Saskatchewan) Armstrong/Quick	1	0	1	0	2	0	1	0	5

=== Semifinals ===
Sunday, March 17, 1:00 pm

Sheet 3	1	2	3	4	5	6	7	8	Final
(Quebec) Desjardins/Néron	3	2	0	0	0	2	0	0	7
(Nova Scotia) Dacey/Smith-Dacey	0	0	2	1	1	0	1	1	6

Sheet 6	1	2	3	4	5	6	7	8	Final
(Saskatchewan) Hicke/Eberle	0	1	1	0	1	0	1	X	4
(Saskatchewan) Kalthoff/Martin	2	0	0	2	0	3	0	X	7

=== Final ===
Sunday, March 17, 4:00 pm

Sheet 4	1	2	3	4	5	6	7	8	Final
(Quebec) Desjardins/Néron	1	0	0	1	1	0	2	2	7
(Saskatchewan) Kalthoff/Martin	0	1	1	0	0	1	0	0	3
