= Preload =

Preload may refer to:

== Science and technology ==
- Preload (cardiology), maximum stretch of the heart at the end of diastole
- preload (software), code-prefetching software for Linux
- Preload (engineering), the internal application of stress to certain mechanical systems

== Other uses ==
- Pre-loading, drinking alcohol at home before going to public places to drink

== See also ==
- Load (disambiguation)
