= John Loder =

John Loder may refer to:

- John Loder (actor) (1898–1988), British actor
- John Loder (landowner) (c.1726–1805), English clergyman, landowner and founder of the Old Berkshire Hunt
- John Loder (sound engineer) (1946–2005), English sound engineer, record producer and founder of Southern Studios
- John Loder, 2nd Baron Wakehurst (1895–1970), British politician
- John David Loder (1788–1846), English violinist
