= Loders (disambiguation) =

Loders is a village in Dorset, England. Loders may also refer to:

== Places ==
Australia

- Loders Creek, river in Queensland

England

- Loders and Bothenhampton Liberty, historical administrative area in Dorset
- Loders Priory, historical religious house in Dorset

== See also ==
- Loder, a surname
