= Preload (software) =

Linux program for preloading frequently used files

preload is a free Linux program which runs as a daemon to record statistics about usage of files by more frequently-used programs. This information is then used to keep these files preloaded into memory. This results in faster application startup times as less data needs to be fetched from disk. preload is often paired with prelink. preload was written by Behdad Esfahbod and uses Markov chains in its implementation.

== See also ==
- Prefetching
- Readahead
