= Loader =

Loader can refer to:

- Loader (equipment)
- Loader (computing)
  - LOADER.EXE, an auto-start program loader optionally used in the startup process of Microsoft Windows ME
- Loader (surname)
- Fast loader
- Speedloader
- Boot loader
  - LOADER.COM (aka "NEWLDR"), a multi-boot loader shipping with various Digital Research, Novell, IMS, Caldera, etc. DOS-based operating systems like Multiuser DOS and DR-DOS
  - LOADER.SYS, part of a LOADER.COM installation (see above)
- Clapper loader (on a film crew, also simply known as "loader")
- A loader, a member of a crew responsible for handling and loading ammunition, such as on a howitzer or tank crew
  - Autoloader, an automated replacement for a crewer loader

== See also ==
- Loder
- LOADR
- NEWLDR
- Load (disambiguation)
