= Courtney Chenier =

Canadian curler

- Curler
- Born: October 5, 1992 (age 34); New Liskeard, Ontario

Team
- Curling club: Idylwylde G&CC, Sudbury, ON

Curling career
- Member Association: Northern Ontario
- Hearts: 1 (2015)
- Top CTRS ranking: 97th (2012–13)

Courtney Chenier (born October 5, 1992 in New Liskeard, Ontario) is a Canadian curler from Ottawa, Ontario. She was the alternate for the Tracy Fleury rink at the 2015 Scotties Tournament of Hearts.

== Career ==
Chenier won the 2011 and 2012 Northern Ontario Junior Curling Championships as a member of the Kendra Lilly rink. This qualified her for the Canadian Junior Curling Championships in each of those years. At the 2011 Canadian Junior Curling Championships, Chenier's team of Lilly, Jen Gates and Kim Curtin went 6–6 and missed the playoffs. At the 2012 Canadian Junior Curling Championships, her team of Lilly, Crystal Lillico and Avery Thomas went 6–6 again, missing the playoffs.

Following her junior career, Chenier and Lilly formed their own rink with Laura Pickering-Forget and Joanne Comé-Forget. They went 4–5 with this team at her first provincial championship in 2013. Chenier and her team qualified for playoffs at the 2014 Ontario Scotties Tournament of Hearts, losing in the 3 vs. 4 page playoff game.

Chenier spared for the Tracy Horgan rink during the 2015 Northern Ontario Scotties Tournament of Hearts. The team became the first women's team to represent Northern Ontario at the Scotties, after winning the provincials with a 5–0 record and defeating former skip Kendra Lilly 4–3 in the final. Team Fleury then had to win a relegation qualifier prior to the 2015 Scotties Tournament of Hearts in order to compete in the main tournament.

During the relegation round at the 2015 Scotties Tournament of Hearts, Northern Ontario defeated Kerry Galusha from the Northwest Territories 10–5 and then beat Sarah Koltun from the Yukon 7–5. In the pre-qualification final, they once again defeated the team from Yellowknife, 7–6, securing the right to represent Northern Ontario in the main draw at the Scotties for the first time. In the main event, they found some success defeating higher seeds such as Julie Hastings and Stefanie Lawton. Chenier played in two games against Nova Scotia and New Brunswick, winning both. Headed into draw seventeen, the final draw before playoffs, Northern Ontario and Rachel Homan, Team Canada at the time, shared 6–4 records. The winner of their game would determine the fourth seed for playoffs, and the loser would be eliminated. After leading 4–2 after six ends, they would allow Homan to score two points in the seventh end to tie the game. After a blank in the eighth, Fleury was heavy on a tap attempt in the ninth end and gave up a steal of two points. Homan would run them out of stones in the tenth end to win 6–5. Therefore, Northern Ontario finished fifth at the 2015 event with a 6–5 record.

== Teams ==
Season	Skip	Third	Second	Lead	Alternate
2010–11	Kendra Lilly	Jen Gates	Courtney Chenier	Kim Curtin	
2011–12	Kendra Lilly	Crystal Lillico	Courtney Chenier	Avery Thomas	
2012–13	Kendra Lilly	Laura Forget	Courtney Chenier	JoAnne Comé-Forget	
2013–14	Kendra Lilly	Laura Forget	Courtney Chenier	Amanda Corkal	
2014–15	Tracy Horgan	Jennifer Horgan	Jenna Enge	Amanda Gates	Courtney Chenier
2016–17	Janet McGhee	Jaimee Gardner	Laura LaBonte	Courtney Chenier	
