= Jenna Loder =

Canadian curler

- Curler
- Born: July 11, 1988 (age 38); Winnipeg, Manitoba

Team
- Curling club: Assiniboine Memorial CC, Winnipeg, MB

Curling career
- Member Association: Manitoba (2007–2014; 2016–present); Saskatchewan (2014–2015); British Columbia (2015–2016)
- Hearts: 1 (2021)
- Top CTRS ranking: 12th (2019–20)
- Grand Slam victories: 1 (2011 Autumn Gold)
Medal record
Women's curling
Representing Canada
World Junior Curling Championships
Silver medal – second place	2009 Vancouver
Bronze medal – third place	2008 Östersund

Jenna Loder (born July 11, 1988) is a Canadian curler from Winnipeg, Manitoba. She is a two-time Canadian junior champion and two-time world junior medallist (2008, 2009), playing third for Kaitlyn Lawes.

== Career ==
Loder, along with skip Kaitlyn Lawes, second Liz Peters, and lead Sarah Wazney, represented Manitoba at the 2008 Canadian Junior Curling Championships, where they won, beating Stephanie McVicar's Saskatchewan rink in the final to qualify for the 2008 World Junior Curling Championships. There, the team lost the 3 vs. 4 playoff game against Russia's Liudmila Privivkova; they faced the Russians again in the bronze medal match, which they won.

Loder, along with Lawes and a new front end of Laryssa Grenkow and Breanne Meakin, returned to the 2009 Canadian Junior Curling Championships, making playoffs and defeating Rachel Homan's team from Ontario in the final. At the 2009 World Junior Curling Championships, the team lost the final to Eve Muirhead's team from Great Britain and claimed the silver medal. On the World Curling Tour that season, the team made it to the semifinals of a Grand Slam, the 2008 Casinos of Winnipeg Classic.

Loder skipped her own team of Liz Peters, Sarah Wazney, and Mary Jane McKenzie for the 2009–10 curling season. They competed in one Grand Slam, the 2009 Manitoba Lotteries Women's Curling Classic.

For the 2010–11 curling season, Loder played second for Jill Thurston. The team qualified for the 2011 Manitoba Scotties Tournament of Hearts, but failed to make playoffs.

The following season, Loder joined Cathy Overton-Clapham's team at third. The team won the 2011 Curlers Corner Autumn Gold Curling Classic, participated in the 2012 Manitoba Scotties Tournament of Hearts, and were finalists in the 2012 Players' Championship. The team remained intact for the 2012–13 curling season, but missed playoffs at all four Grand Slams that they played in and the 2013 Manitoba Scotties Tournament of Hearts, and they placed last in the round robin of the 2012 Canada Cup of Curling, winning a single match. That season, Loder also competed in the 2013 Canadian Mixed Doubles Curling Trials with teammate Josh Heidt. They started with two wins but narrowly missed playoffs.

Loder was the second for Barb Spencer during the 2013–14 curling season. The team won one event that season, the DEKALB Superspiel. They competed in the 2013 Canadian Olympic Curling Pre-Trials, but were eliminated from playoff contention following a loss to Cheryl Bernard. They placed third in the 2014 Manitoba Scotties Tournament of Hearts after losing in the semifinal to the eventual winner, Chelsea Carey. Loder and Heidt competed again in the 2014 Canadian Mixed Doubles Curling Trials, but missed playoffs again.

For the 2014–15 curling season, Loder joined Trish Paulsen's Saskatchewan team at second. The team competed in the 2015 Saskatchewan Scotties Tournament of Hearts but failed to reach playoffs.

Loder joined Kelly Scott's British Columbia rink at second for the 2015–16 curling season. The team, with third Shannon Joanisse and lead Sarah Pyke, were finalists in the 2016 British Columbia Scotties Tournament of Hearts, losing to Karla Thompson.

Loder returned to playing third during the 2016–17 curling season, when she returned to Manitoba to play for Cathy Overton-Clapham, with a front end of Katherine Doerksen and Sarah Pyke. The team missed playoffs at the 2017 Manitoba Scotties Tournament of Hearts.

Loder and Doerksen joined the Beth Peterson team for the 2018–19 season. The team had three semifinal finishes on the tour and won the Manitoba Scotties Berth Bonspiel to qualify for the 2019 Manitoba Scotties Tournament of Hearts. Team Peterson would have a very successful provincial championship in their first season as a team, finishing 5–2 through the round robin and qualifying for a tiebreaker against Abby Ackland. Despite tying the game in the seventh end, Team Peterson would give up three points in the eighth end, ultimately losing the game 8–7. The 2019–20 season was a successful season for the Peterson rink as they qualified for the playoffs in eight of their ten events. They also got to play in the 2019 Tour Challenge Tier 2 where they lost in the semifinal to South Korea's Kim Min-ji. Despite entering the 2020 Manitoba Scotties Tournament of Hearts as the fourth seed, Team Peterson finished the round robin with a 2–3 record, failing to reach the championship pool round.

Due to the COVID-19 pandemic in Canada, many provinces had to cancel their provincial championships, with member associations selecting their representatives for the 2021 Scotties Tournament of Hearts. Due to this situation, Curling Canada added three Wild Card teams to the national championship, which were determined by the CTRS standings from the 2019–20 season. Because Team Peterson ranked 12th on the CTRS and kept at least three of their four players together for the 2020–21 season, they got the third Wild Card spot at the 2021 Scotties in Calgary, Alberta. One member of Team Peterson, Melissa Gordon opted to not attend the Scotties due to work commitments. She was replaced by Brittany Tran, who competed at the Scotties in 2019 as second for the Northwest Territories. At the Tournament of Hearts, they finished with a respectable 7–5 fifth-place finish.

In their first event of the 2021–22 season, Team Peterson reached the final of the Mother Club Fall Curling Classic where they lost to Mackenzie Zacharias. They were then semifinalists at the Atkins Curling Supplies Classic. With their successful results over the past few seasons, Team Peterson had enough points to qualify for the 2021 Canadian Olympic Curling Pre-Trials. There, the team missed the playoffs after a 1–5 record. At the 2022 Manitoba Scotties Tournament of Hearts, the team began with two straight wins before losing the rest of their games, finishing just outside the playoffs at 2–3. Team Peterson rounded out their season at the 2022 Best of the West where they lost in the final to Corryn Brown.

To begin the 2022–23 season, Team Peterson qualified for the playoffs at three straight events. They began with a semifinal finish at the Mother Club Fall Curling Classic before winning the Atkins Curling Supplies Classic. The team then played in the 2022 Western Showdown, however, with Robyn Silvernagle sparing for Peterson at skip. At the event, the team defeated many higher seeds such as Kim Eun-jung, Clancy Grandy and Isabella Wranå, ultimately losing in the semifinals to Silvana Tirinzoni. Team Peterson had a strong showing at the 2023 Manitoba Scotties Tournament of Hearts, beginning with a 4–1 record through the round robin. They went on to finish 5–3 after the championship round and then lost a tiebreaker to Meghan Walter to advance to the playoffs. The team ended their season at the Best of the West where they were again defeated by Corryn Brown in the championship game. Peterson was replaced by Kelsey Rocque for the event.

== Personal life ==
As of 2021, Loder works as a technical advisor for the Federal Government.

== Teams ==
Season	Skip	Third	Second	Lead	Alternate
2007–08	Kaitlyn Lawes	Jenna Loder	Liz Peters	Sarah Wazney	
2008–09	Kaitlyn Lawes	Jenna Loder	Laryssa Grenkow	Breanne Meakin	
2009–10	Jenna Loder	Liz Peters	Sarah Wazney	Mary Jane McKenzie	
2010–11	Jill Thurston	Kristen Phillips	Jenna Loder	Kendra Georges	
2011–12	Cathy Overton-Clapham	Jenna Loder	Ashley Howard	Breanne Meakin	
2012–13	Cathy Overton-Clapham	Jenna Loder	Ashley Howard	Breanne Meakin	
2013–14	Barb Spencer	Katie Spencer	Jenna Loder	Raunora Westcott	
2014–15	Trish Paulsen	Kari Johanson	Jenna Loder	Kari Paulsen	
2015–16	Kelly Scott	Shannon Joanisse	Jenna Loder	Sarah Pyke	
2016–17	Cathy Overton-Clapham	Jenna Loder	Katherine Doerksen	Sarah Pyke	
2017–18	Rhonda Varnes	Jenna Loder	Katherine Doerksen	Danielle Robinson	
2018–19	Beth Peterson	Jenna Loder	Katherine Doerksen	Melissa Gordon	
2019–20	Beth Peterson	Jenna Loder	Katherine Doerksen	Melissa Gordon	
2020–21	Beth Peterson	Jenna Loder	Katherine Doerksen	Melissa Gordon	
2021–22	Beth Peterson	Jenna Loder	Katherine Doerksen	Melissa Gordon	
2022–23	Beth Peterson	Jenna Loder	Katherine Doerksen	Melissa Gordon	
2023–24	Beth Peterson	Kelsey Rocque	Katherine Doerksen	Melissa Gordon	Jenna Loder
