= Structural load =

Mechanical loads (forces) applied to a structure or its components

A structural load or structural action is a mechanical load (more generally a force) applied to structural elements. A load causes stress, deformation, displacement or acceleration in a structure. Structural analysis, a discipline in engineering, analyzes the effects of loads on structures and structural elements. Excess load may cause structural failure, so this should be considered and controlled during the design of a structure. Particular mechanical structures—such as aircraft, satellites, rockets, space stations, ships, and submarines—are subject to their own particular structural loads and actions. Engineers often evaluate structural loads based upon published regulations, contracts, or specifications. Accepted technical standards are used for acceptance testing and inspection.

== Types ==
In civil engineering, specified loads are the best estimate of the actual loads a structure is expected to carry. These loads come in many different forms, such as people, equipment, vehicles, wind, rain, snow, earthquakes, the building materials themselves, etc. Specified loads also known as characteristic loads in many cases.

Buildings will be subject to loads from various sources. The principal ones can be classified as live loads (loads which are not always present in the structure), dead loads (loads which are permanent and immovable excepting redesign or renovation) and wind load, as described below. In some cases structures may be subject to other loads, such as those due to earthquakes or pressures from retained material. The expected maximum magnitude of each is referred to as the characteristic load.

Dead loads are static forces that are relatively constant for an extended time. They can be in tension or compression. The term can refer to a laboratory test method or to the normal usage of a material or structure.

Live loads are usually variable or moving load. These can have a significant dynamic element and may involve considerations such as impact, momentum, vibration, slosh dynamics of fluids, etc.

An impact load is one whose time of application on a material is less than one-third of the natural period of vibration of that material.

Cyclic loads on a structure can lead to fatigue damage, cumulative damage, or failure. These loads can be repeated loadings on a structure or can be due to vibration.

Imposed loads are those associated with occupation and use of the building; their magnitude is less clearly defined and is generally related to the use of the building.

== Loads on architectural and civil engineering structures ==
Structural loads are an important consideration in the design of buildings. Building codes require that structures be designed and built to safely resist all actions that they are likely to face during their service life, while remaining fit for use. Minimum loads or actions are specified in these building codes for types of structures, geographic locations, usage and building materials. Structural loads are split into categories by their originating cause. In terms of the actual load on a structure, there is no difference between dead or live loading, but the split occurs for use in safety calculations or ease of analysis on complex models.

To meet the requirement that design strength be higher than maximum loads, building codes prescribe that, for structural design, loads are increased by load factors. These load factors are, roughly, a ratio of the theoretical design strength to the maximum load expected in service. They are developed to help achieve the desired level of reliability of a structure based on probabilistic studies that take into account the load's originating cause, recurrence, distribution, and static or dynamic nature.

=== Dead load ===
Dead load

The dead load includes loads that are relatively constant over time, including the weight of the structure itself, and immovable fixtures such as walls, plasterboard or carpet. The roof is also a dead load. Dead loads are also known as permanent or static loads. Building materials are not dead loads until constructed in permanent position. IS875(part 1)-1987 give unit weight of building materials, parts, components.

=== Live load ===
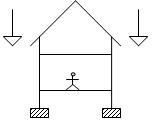
Imposed load (live load)

Live loads, or imposed loads, are temporary, of short duration, or a moving load. These dynamic loads may involve considerations such as impact, momentum, vibration, slosh dynamics of fluids and material fatigue.

Live loads, sometimes also referred to as probabilistic loads, include all the forces that are variable within the object's normal operation cycle not including construction or environmental loads.

Roof and floor live loads are produced during maintenance by workers, equipment and materials, and during the life of the structure by movable objects, such as planters and people.

Bridge live loads are produced by vehicles traveling over the deck of the bridge.

=== Environmental loads ===
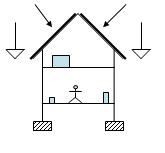
Live snow load

Environmental loads are structural loads caused by natural forces such as wind, rain, snow, earthquake or extreme temperatures.

- Wind loads
- Snow, rain and ice loads
- Seismic loads
- Hydrostatic loads
- Temperature changes leading to thermal expansion cause thermal loads
- Ponding loads
- Frost heaving
- Lateral pressure of soil, groundwater or bulk materials
- Loads from fluids or floods
- Permafrost melting
- Dust loads

=== Other loads ===
Engineers must also be aware of other actions that may affect a structure, such as:

- Foundation settlement or displacement
- Fire
- Corrosion
- Explosion
- Creep or shrinkage
- Impact from vehicles or machinery vibration
- Construction loads

=== Load combinations ===
A load combination results when more than one load type acts on the structure. Building codes usually specify a variety of load combinations together with load factors (weightings) for each load type in order to ensure the safety of the structure under different maximum expected loading scenarios. For example, in designing a staircase, a dead load factor may be 1.2 times the weight of the structure, and a live load factor may be 1.6 times the maximum expected live load. These two "factored loads" are combined (added) to determine the "required strength" of the staircase.

The size of the load factor is based on the probability of exceeding any specified design load. Dead loads have small load factors, such as 1.2, because weight is mostly known and accounted for, such as structural members, architectural elements and finishes, large pieces of mechanical, electrical and plumbing (MEP) equipment, and for buildings, it's common to include a Super Imposed Dead Load (SIDL) of around 5 pounds per square foot (psf) accounting for miscellaneous weight such as bolts and other fasteners, cabling, and various fixtures or small architectural elements. Live loads, on the other hand, can be furniture, moveable equipment, or the people themselves, and may increase beyond normal or expected amounts in some situations, so a larger factor of 1.6 attempts to quantify this extra variability. Snow will also use a maximum factor of 1.6, while lateral loads (earthquakes and wind) are defined such that a 1.0 load factor is practical. Multiple loads may be added together in different ways, such as 1.2*Dead + 1.0*Live + 1.0*Earthquake + 0.2*Snow, or 1.2*Dead + 1.6(Snow, Live(roof), OR Rain) + (1.0*Live OR 0.5*Wind).

== Aircraft structural loads ==
For aircraft, loading is divided into two major categories: limit loads and ultimate loads. Limit loads are the maximum loads a component or structure may carry safely. Ultimate loads are the limit loads times a factor of 1.5 or the point beyond which the component or structure will fail. Gust loads are determined statistically and are provided by an agency such as the Federal Aviation Administration. Crash loads are loosely bounded by the ability of structures to survive the deceleration of a major ground impact. Other loads that may be critical are pressure loads (for pressurized, high-altitude aircraft) and ground loads. Loads on the ground can be from adverse braking or maneuvering during taxiing. Aircraft are constantly subjected to cyclic loading. These cyclic loads can cause metal fatigue.

== See also ==
- Hotel New World disaster – caused by omitting the dead load of the building in load calculations
- Influence line
- Probabilistic design
- Mechanical load
- Structural testing
- Southwell plot
