= Load, Kentucky =

Unincorporated community in Kentucky, United States

- Unincorporate
- Location within Kentucky Location within the United States
- Coordinates: 38°32′46″N 82°58′15″W
- Country: United States
- State: Kentucky
- County: Greenup
- Elevation: 577 ft (176 m)
- Time zone: UTC-5 (Eastern (CST))
  - Summer (DST): UTC-4 (EST)
- GNIS feature ID: 496921

Load is an unincorporated community located in Greenup County, Kentucky, United States.

Load sits adjacent to Tygarts Creek, and along Kentucky Route 7.
