= Loader (surname) =

Loader is a surname. Notable people with the surname include:

- Christian Loader (born 1973), Welsh rugby union player
- Clive Loader (born 1953), RAF officer and Leicestershire Police and Crime Commissioner
- Colin Loader (1931–2021), New Zealand rugby union player
- Bill Loader (born 1944), Australian theologian
- Brian Loader (born 1958), British scholar and researcher
- Danyon Loader (born 1975), New Zealand swimmer
- Graham Loader, editor of Hob Nob Anyone?
- Jayne Loader (born 1951), American director and writer
- Peter Loader (1929–2011), English cricketer and umpire
