= John Loder (landowner) =

British landowner (1726–1805)

Reverend John Loder
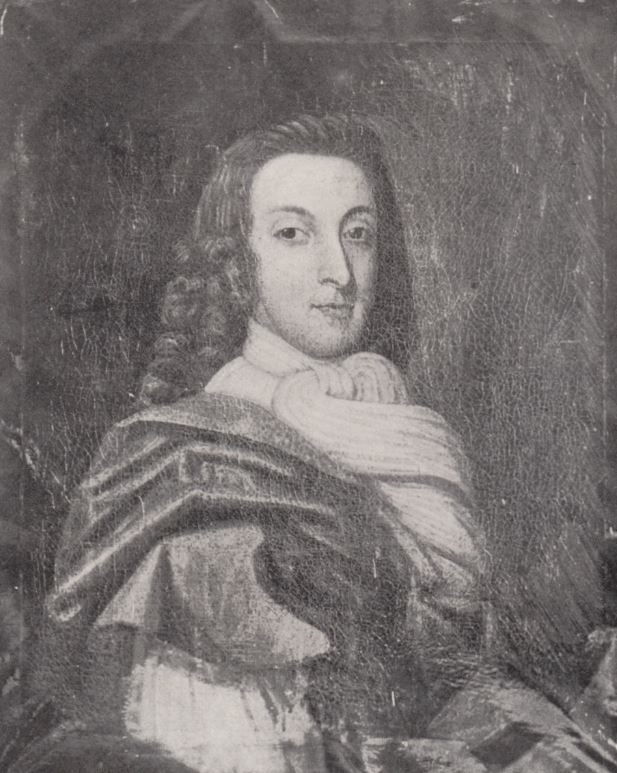
- John Loder 1726–1805
- Born: c. 1726
- Died: 31 May 1805

John Loder (c. 1726 – 1805) was a clergyman, landowner and founder of the Old Berkshire Hunt.

== Family ==
Loder was a descendant of a family that were landowners at Princes Harwell in the time of Elizabeth I of England.

== Early life and education ==
Loder was the son of the Reverend Seymour Loder (1693-1743), who was Lord of the Manor and rector of Hinton Waldrist. John was educated at John Roysse's Free School in Abingdon-on-Thames, (now Abingdon School) circa 1735–1742. In 1743, he entered Oriel College during the same year as his brother Charles Loder and later graduated M.A.

== Career ==
Loder was ordained in London by fellow Old Abingdonian Lord James Beauclerk in 1749. He was rector of Hinton Waldrist and lord of the manors of Hinton and Longworth. He was the owner of Balstone Park in Hinton Waldrist. He was a steward of the Old Abingdonian Club in 1758.

Loder began keeping hounds after he came into his properties at Hinton and Longworth (after his father's death). Doghouse Patch near Hinton Manor indicates the location of the kennels. He later established the Old Berkshire Hunt at Hinton Manor, where the kennels were located from 1760 to 1814. One hunt in 1766, lasting five hours and twenty minutes is recorded in verse form by Willoughby Bertie, 4th Earl of Abingdon, who was a hunt member and acquaintance of Loder.

Loder passed on the mastership in 1800, to his son-in-law Robert Symonds.

== See also ==
- List of Old Abingdonians
