= Moving load =

Load that changes in time

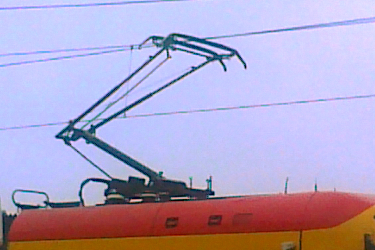
Pantograph

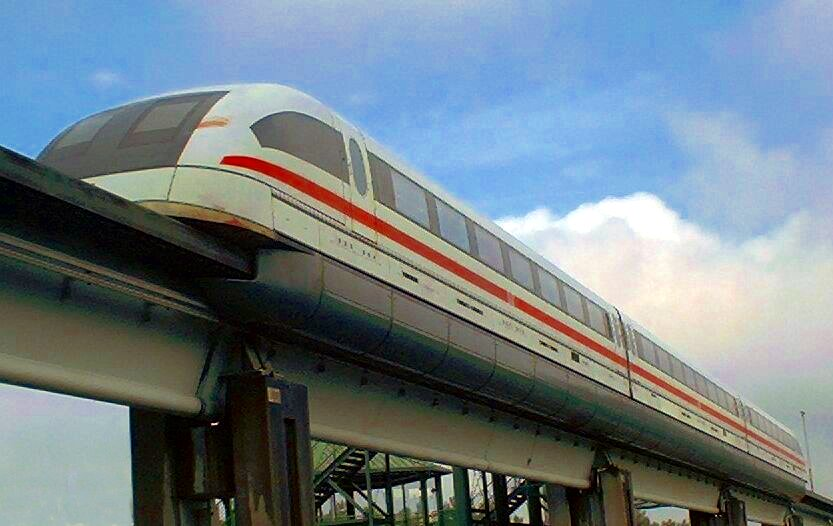
Train

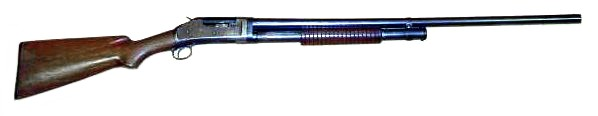
Rifle

Examples of a moving load.

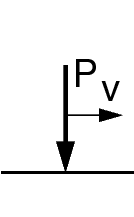
Force

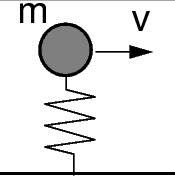
Oscillator

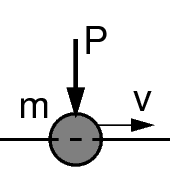
Mass

Types of a moving load.

In structural dynamics, a moving load changes the point at which the load is applied over time. Examples include a vehicle that travels across a bridge and a train moving along a track.

== Properties ==
In computational models, load is usually applied as

- a simple massless force,
- an oscillator, or
- an inertial force (mass and a massless force).

Numerous historical reviews of the moving load problem exist. Several publications deal with similar problems.

The fundamental monograph is devoted to massless loads. Inertial load in numerical models is described in

Unexpected property of differential equations that govern the motion of the mass particle travelling on the string, Timoshenko beam, and Mindlin plate is described in. It is the discontinuity of the mass trajectory near the end of the span (well visible in string at the speed v=0.5c). The moving load significantly increases displacements. The critical velocity, at which the growth of displacements is the maximum, must be taken into account in engineering projects.

Structures that carry moving loads can have finite dimensions or can be infinite and supported periodically or placed on the elastic foundation.

Consider simply supported string of the length l, cross-sectional area A, mass density ρ, tensile force N, subjected to a constant force P moving with constant velocity v. The motion equation of the string under the moving force has a form

$$-N\frac{\partial^2w(x,t)}{\partial x^2}+\rho
A\frac{\partial^2w(x,t)}{\partial t^2}=\delta(x-vt)P\ .$$

Displacements of any point of the simply supported string is given by the sinus series

$$w(x,t) = \frac{2P}{\rho
Al}\sum_{j=1}^{\infty}\frac{1}{\omega_{(j)}^2-\omega^2}\left(\sin(\omega
t)-\frac{\omega}{\omega_{(j)}}\sin(\omega_{(j)}t)\right)\sin\frac{j\pi x}{l}\ ,$$

where

$$\omega=\frac{j\pi v}{l}\ ,$$

and the natural circular frequency of the string

$$\omega_{(j)}^2=\frac{j^2\pi^2}{l^2}\frac{N}{\rho A}\ .$$

In the case of inertial moving load, the analytical solutions are unknown. The equation of motion is increased by the term related to the inertia of the moving load. A concentrated mass m accompanied by a point force P:

$$-N\frac{\partial^2w(x,t)}{\partial x^2}+\rho
A\frac{\partial^2w(x,t)}{\partial
t^2}=\delta(x-vt)P-\delta(x-vt)m\frac{\mbox{d}^2w(vt,t)}{\mbox{d}t^2}\ .$$

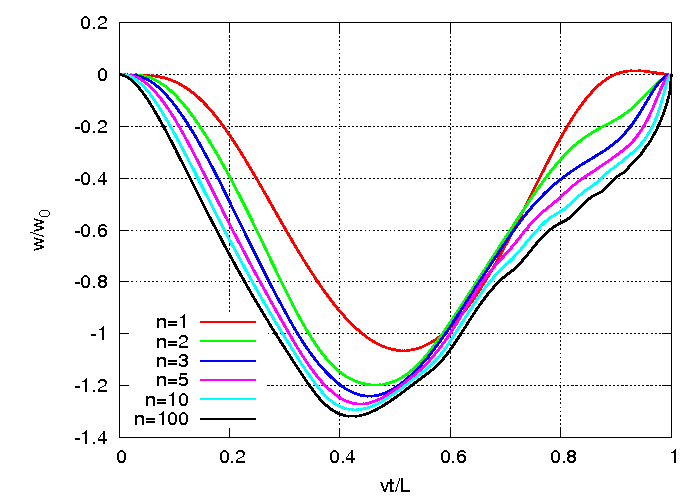
Convergence of the solution for different number of terms.

The last term, because of complexity of computations, is often neglected by engineers. The load influence is reduced to the massless load term. Sometimes the oscillator is placed in the contact point. Such approaches are acceptable only in low range of the travelling load velocity. In higher ranges both the amplitude and the frequency of vibrations differ significantly in the case of both types of a load.

The differential equation can be solved in a semi-analytical way only for simple problems. The series determining the solution converges well and 2-3 terms are sufficient in practice. More complex problems can be solved by the finite element method or space-time finite element method.

massless load	inertial load
Vibrations of a string under a moving massless force (v=0.1c); c is the wave speed. Vibrations of a string under a moving massless force (v=0.5c); c is the wave speed.	Vibrations of a string under a moving inertial force (v=0.1c); c is the wave speed. Vibrations of a string under a moving inertial force (v=0.5c); c is the wave speed.

The discontinuity of the mass trajectory is also well visible in the Timoshenko beam. High shear stiffness emphasizes the phenomenon.

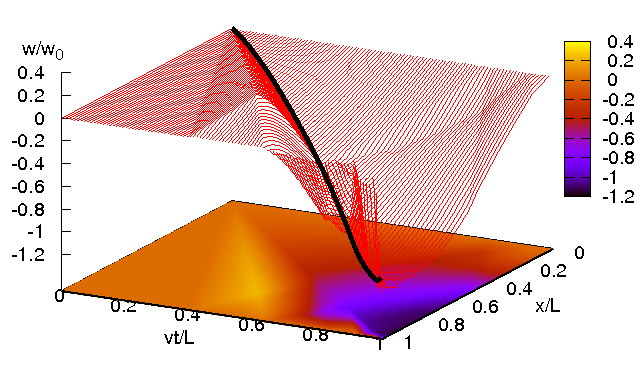
Vibrations of the Timoshenko beam: red lines - beam axes in time, black line - mass trajectory (w_{0}- static deflection).

== The Renaudot approach vs. the Yakushev approach ==
=== Renaudot approach ===
$\delta(x-vt)\frac{\mbox{d}}{\mbox{d}t}\left[m\frac{\mbox{d}w(vt,t)}{\mbox{d}t}\right]=\delta(x-vt)m\frac{\mbox{d}^2w(vt,t)}{\mbox{d}t^2}\ .$

=== Yakushev approach ===
$\frac{\mbox{d}}{\mbox{d}t}\left[\delta(x-vt)m\frac{\mbox{d}w(vt,t)}{\mbox{d}t}\right]=-\delta^\prime(x-vt)mv\frac{\mbox{d}w(vt,t)}{\mbox{d}t}+\delta(x-vt)m\frac{\mbox{d}^2w(vt,t)}{\mbox{d}t^2}\ .$

== Massless string under moving inertial load ==
Consider a massless string, which is a particular case of moving inertial load problem. The first to solve the problem was Smith. The analysis will follow the solution of Fryba. Assuming ρ=0, the equation of motion of a string under a moving mass can be put into the following form

$$-N\frac{\partial^2w(x,t)}{\partial x^2}=\delta(x-vt)P-\delta(x-vt)\,m\frac{\mbox{d}^2w(vt,t)}{\mbox{d}t^2}\ .$$

We impose simply-supported boundary conditions and zero initial conditions. To solve this equation we use the convolution property. We assume dimensionless displacements of the string y and dimensionless time τ:

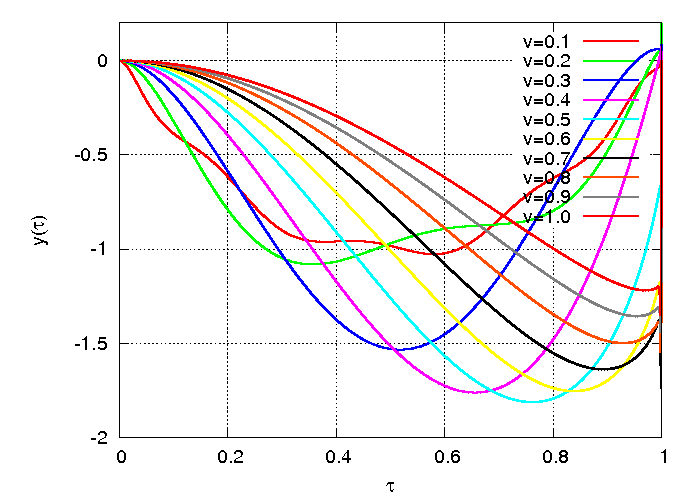
Massless string and a moving mass - mass trajectory.

$$y(\tau)=\frac{w(vt,t)}{w_{st}}\ ,\ \ \ \ \tau\ =\ \frac{vt}{l}\ ,$$

where w_{st} is the static deflection in the middle of the string. The solution is given by a sum

$$y(\tau)=\frac{4\,\alpha}{\alpha\,-\,1}\,\tau\,(\tau-1)\,\sum_{k=1}^\infty\,\prod_{i=1}^k\frac{(a+i-1)(b+i-1)}{c+i-1}\;\frac{\tau^k}{k!}\ ,$$

where α is the dimensionless parameters :

$$\alpha=\frac{Nl}{2mv2}\,>\,0\ \ \ \wedge\ \ \ \alpha\,\neq\,1\ .$$

Parameters a, b and c are given below

$$a_{1,2}=\frac{3\,\pm\,\sqrt{1+8\alpha}}{2}\ ,\ \ \ \ \ b_{1,2}=\frac{3\,\mp\,\sqrt{1+8\alpha}}{2}\ ,\ \ \ \ \ c=2\ .$$

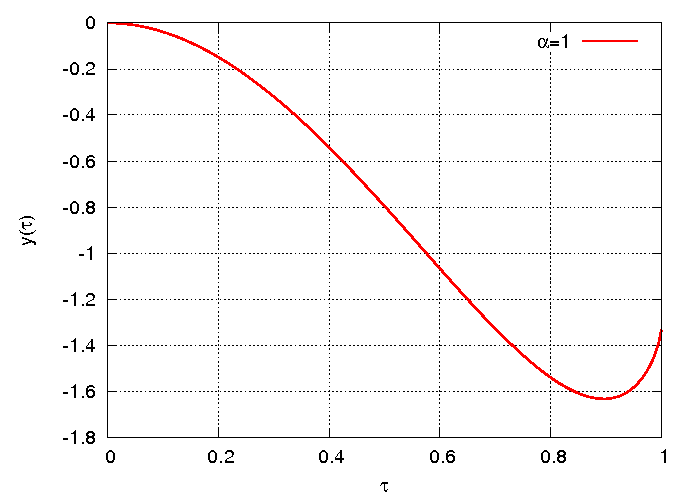
Massless string and a moving mass - mass trajectory, α=1.

In the case of α=1, the considered problem has a closed solution: $y(\tau )=\left[\frac{4}{3}\tau (1-\tau) -\frac{4}{3}\tau \left( 1+2 \tau\ln (1-\tau )+2\ln (1-\tau )\right)\right]\ .$
