= Mechanical load =

Physical stress on a mechanical system or component

Mechanical load is the physical stress on a mechanical system or component leading to strain. Loads can be static or dynamic. Some loads are specified as part of the design criteria of a mechanical system. Depending on the usage, some mechanical loads can be measured by an appropriate test method in a laboratory or in the field.

== Vehicle ==
It can be the external mechanical resistance against which a machine (such as a motor or engine), acts. The load can often be expressed as a curve of force versus speed.

For instance, a given car traveling on a road of a given slope presents a load which the engine must act against. Because air resistance increases with speed, the motor must put out more torque at a higher speed in order to maintain the speed. By shifting to a higher gear, one may be able to meet the requirement with a higher torque and a lower engine speed, whereas shifting to a lower gear has the opposite effect. Accelerating increases the load, whereas decelerating decreases the load.

== Pump ==
Similarly, the load on a pump depends on the head against which the pump is pumping, and on the size of the pump.

== Fan ==
Similar considerations apply to a fan. See Affinity laws.

== See also ==
- Structural load - mechanical load applied to structural elements (in civil and mechanical engineering)
- Physical test
