= Retter =

Retter is a surname. Notable people with the surname include:

- Erich Retter (1925–2014), German footballer
- Hannah Retter (1839–1940), New Zealand midwife
- Yolanda Retter (1947–2007), American lesbian librarian, archivist, scholar, and activist

== See also ==
- Ritter (surname)
