= August Ritter =

August Ritter may refer to:

- August Gottfried Ritter (1811–1885), German composer
- August Ritter (civil engineer) (1826–1908)
- Bill Ritter (August William "Bill" Ritter) (born 1956), governor of Colorado 2007–2011

== See also ==
- Ritter (surname)
