= Ritner =

Ritner is a surname. Notable people with the surname include:

- Joseph Ritner (1780–1869), American politician
- Robert K. Ritner (1953–2021), American Egyptologist
- R. W. Ritner, a president of Western Tri-State League

== See also ==
- Ritter (surname)
