= Ritter (surname) =

Ritter is a surname of German origin. Notable people with the name include:

== People ==
=== A ===
- Alexander Ritter (1833–1896), German composer, violinist, and conductor
- Alison Ritter, Australian drug policy academic
- Allen Ritter, American songwriter and record producer
- Alois Ritter (1897–1966), Liechtenstein politician
- August Ritter (civil engineer) (1826–1908), German civil engineer
- August Gottfried Ritter (1811–1885), German composer and organist

=== B ===
- Bill Ritter (born 1956), American politician from Colorado
- Bill Ritter (journalist) (born 1950), American news anchor in New York City
- Bruce Ritter (1927–1999), American Catholic priest
- Burwell C. Ritter (1810–1880), American politician from Kentucky

=== C ===
- Carl Ritter (1779–1859), German geographer
- Christian Ritter (1645–50 – after 1725), German composer and organist
- Christian Ritter (footballer) (born 1984), German football player

=== D ===
- Dominik Ritter (born 1989), Swiss football player
- Donald L. Ritter (born 1940), American politician from Pennsylvania

=== E ===
- Elizabeth Ritter (born 1951), American politician
- Erika Ritter (born 1948), Canadian playwright and humorist

=== F ===
- Floyd Ritter (1870–1943), baseball player
- Frédéric Louis Ritter (1834–1891), German-American composer and author
- Friedrich Ritter (1898–1989), German botanist, expert on cacti

=== G ===
- Gerhard Ritter (1888–1967), German historian
- Gerhard A. Ritter (1929–2015), German historian
- Gretchen Ritter, American academic administrator
- Gudrun Ritter (born 1936), German actress

=== H ===
- Halsted L. Ritter (1868–1951), American jurist
- Heinrich Ritter (1791–1869), German philosopher
- Henry Ritter (1816–1853), Canadian genre painter

=== I ===
- Irene Marschand Ritter (fl. 1913-1960), American composer

=== J ===
- J. Alfred Ritter (died 1892), American politician from Maryland
- Jason Ritter (born 1980), American actor, son of John
- Jeannie Ritter (born 1958), American First Lady of Colorado, US; wife of Bill
- Joachim Ritter (1903-1974), German philosopher
- Johann Christian Ritter (1755–1810), South African printer
- Johann Wilhelm Ritter (1776–1810), German chemist and physicist
- Johannes Ritter (born 1995), Danish footballer
- John Ritter (congressman) (1779–1851), American politician from Pennsylvania
- John Ritter (1948–2003), American actor, son of Tex
- John H. Ritter (born 1951), American young-adult baseball novelist
- John Steele Ritter, American pianist
- Joseph Ritter (1892–1967), American cardinal and archbishop
- Josh Ritter (born 1976), American singer-songwriter

=== K ===
- Krysten Ritter (born 1981), American actress

=== L ===
- Lawrence Ritter (1922–2004), American baseball writer
- Lorenz Ritter (1832–1921), German painter
- Lou Ritter (1925–2010), American politician from Florida
- Louise Ritter (born 1958), American track and field athlete

=== M ===
- Matthew Ritter, American politician
- Markus Ritter (art historian) (born 1967), German art historian
- Markus Ritter (born 1967), Swiss politician
- Maya Ritter (born 1993), Canadian actress
- Michael Ritter (born 1957), Liechtenstein politician

=== N ===
- Nikolaus Ritter (1899–1974), German intelligence officer

=== O ===
- Ole Ritter (born 1941), Danish cyclist

=== P ===
- Paul Ritter (1966–2021), British actor
- Paul Ritter (architect) (1925–2010), Australian architect, artist and author
- Paul Ritter (painter) (1829–1907), German architectural painter and etcher
- Paul Ritter (diplomat) (1865–1921), Swiss diplomat
- Preston Ritter (1949–2015), American rock drummer

=== R ===
- Rex Ritter, American guitarist, Jessamine
- Robert Ritter (1901 – c. 1951), German psychologist whose work led to the genocide of the Roma people in Nazi Germany
- Rupert Ritter (1900–1975), Liechtenstein lawyer
- Ryan Ritter (born 2000), American baseball player
- Karlheinz Ritter (1929–2008), Liechtenstein politician

=== S ===
- Sabine Ritter (born 1968), German politician and sociologist
- Scott Ritter (born 1961), chief United Nations weapons inspector in Iraq
- Sylvester Ritter (1952–1998), ring name Junkyard Dog, American wrestler

=== T ===
- Tex Ritter (1905–1974), American singer and actor, father of John
- Thelma Ritter (1902–1969), American actress
- Tyson Ritter (born 1984), American musician, The All-American Rejects

=== W ===
- William Ritter (1867–1955), Swiss writer
- William Emerson Ritter (1856–1944), American biologist
- William M. Ritter (1864–1952), American businessman

=== Others ===
- Mary Ritter Beard (1876–1958), American historian and campaigner for woman's suffrage
- F. Ritter Shumway (1906–1992), American figure skater
- Albert Ritter Conti v. Cedassamare (1887–1967), Italian-American character actor
- Pavao Ritter Vitezović (1652–1713), Croatian writer, historian, linguist, and publisher

== Fictional characters ==
- Donald & Deborah Ritter, characters from Marvel Comics
- Mike Ritter, a Secret Service agent played by LaMonica Garrett in the series Designated Survivor
- Philip Ritter, a doctor played by Paul Henreid in the 1952 film Stolen Face
- Rein Weiss Ritter, a robot in the Super Robot Wars series
- Rhonda Ritter, a character in the 1982 film Grease 2
- Robert (Bob) Ritter, fictional CIA Deputy Director of Operations in the Tom Clancy novel Clear and Present Danger (1989)
  - The same character, played by Henry Czerny, in the 1994 film adaptation of the novel
- Weiss Ritter, a robot in the Super Robot Wars series
- Alwin Ritter, a fictional character in the anime Gundam SEED DESTINY
- Thomas, Jacob, and Lily Ritter, characters from the 2013 video game State of Decay

== See also ==
- Rebecca Ritters (born 1984), Australian actress
