= Rupert Ritter =

Liechtensteiner lawyer (1900–1975)

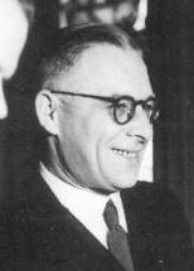
- Ritter in 1945

Personal details
- Born: 5 April 1900 Mauren, Liechtenstein
- Died: 25 April 1975 (aged 75) Grabs, Switzerland
- Spouse(s): Marianne Pinter (m. 1930; died 1962) Hertha Hadschieff Brunner (m. 1964)
- Children: 2

Rupert Ritter (5 April 1900 – 25 April 1975) was an advocate from Liechtenstein who served as secretary of the Princely Cabinet Chancellery from 1939 to 1945.

== Early life ==
Ritter was born on 5 April 1900 in Mauren to the son of farmer and merchant Hansjörg Ritter and his mother Rosina Mündle as one of five children. He attended high school in Feldkirch, then studied agricultural sciences at the Ludwig-Maximilians-Universität München and the University of Vienna, where he received a diploma in agricultural engineering.

== Career ==
He did a two-year banking internship in Munich, then worked on the princely estates in Czechoslovakia. From 1928 to 1934 he was president of the Liechtenstein mutual club, lottery company. From 1934 to 1937 he studied law in Innsbruck and from 1937 to 1939 he worked in the law firm Marxer & Partner Rechtsanwälte, owned by Ludwig Marxer. He was involved in setting up the first radio station in Vaduz.

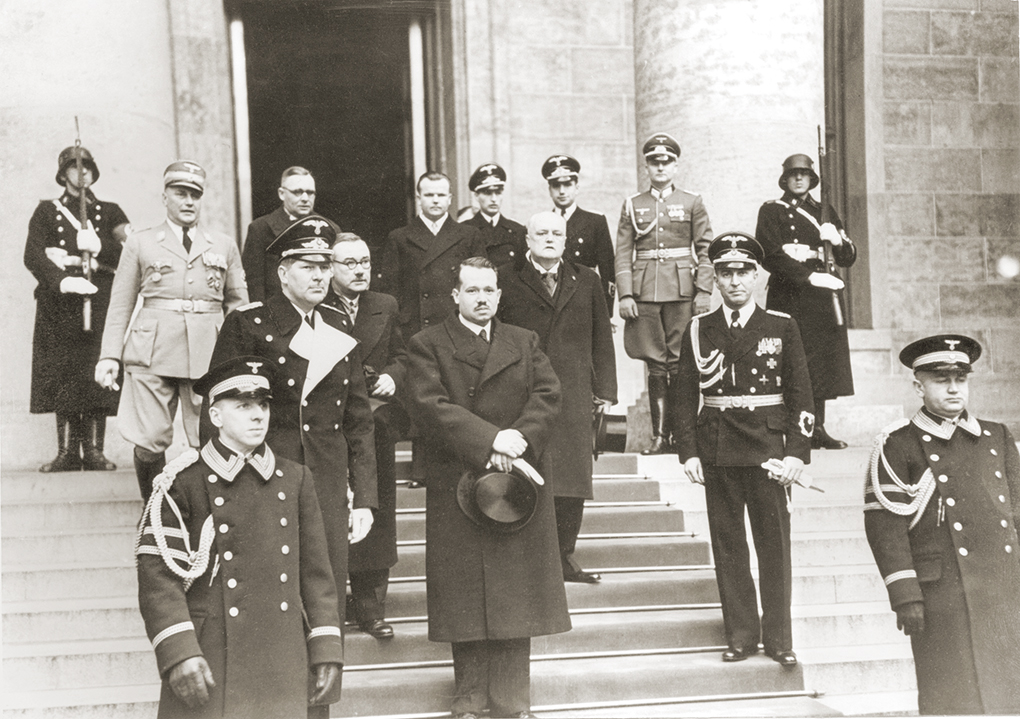
Ritter (back third from right) with members of the Germany Nazi-Regime and of the Liechtenstein government outside the Reich Chancellery in Berlin, 2 March 1939.

From 1939 to 1945 he was secretary of the Princely Cabinet Chancellery, which he played an important role in the Third Hoop cabinet. He frequently corresponded with the likes of Josef Hoop and Franz Joseph II, and on 2 March 1939 he accompanied the two men on an official visit to Berlin, where they met Adolf Hitler and Joachim von Ribbentrop.

In 1946, he founded his own law firm in Vaduz. He was President of the board of directors of the Presidential Institute, of the VBI from 1949 to 1957 and of the Constitutional Court from 1960 to 1975. He wrote biographies on political figures such as Peter Kaiser and contributed to the Historical Association for the Principality of Liechtenstein. From 1946 he was a princely councillor.

Ritter died on 25 April 1975 in Grabs, Switzerland, aged 75 years old.

== Personal life ==
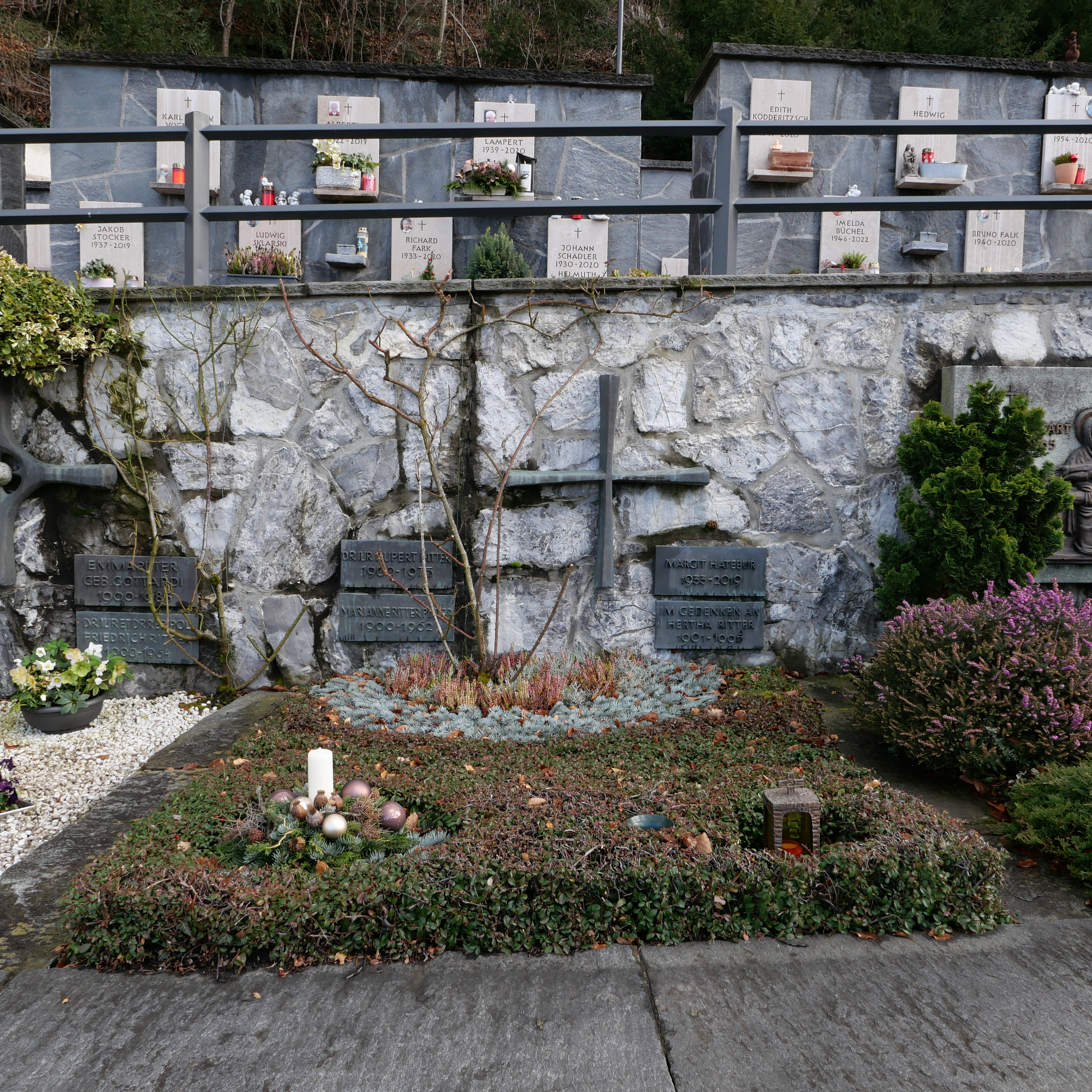
The family grave in 2024.

Ritter married Marianne Pinter (26 August 1900 – 14 December 1962) on 24 June 1930 and they had two daughters together. He then went on to marry Hertha Hadschieff Brunner (1 July 1901 28 October 1995) on 20 July 1964.

He found his final resting place at the cemetery of Vaduz next to his first wife. Their daughter Margit Hatebur (1933-2019) was buried in the same grave. A plaque commemorates Ritter's second wife.
