= Marxer & Partner Rechtsanwälte =

Liechtenstein law firm established in 1925

Coordinates: 47°08′10″N 9°31′18″E

- Headquarters: Heiligkreuz 6, 9490 Vaduz, Liechtenstein
- No. of attorneys: 30
- No. of employees: 60+
- Date founded: June 1925; 100 years ago
- Founder: Ludwig Marxer
- Website: www.marxerpartner.com
- Company
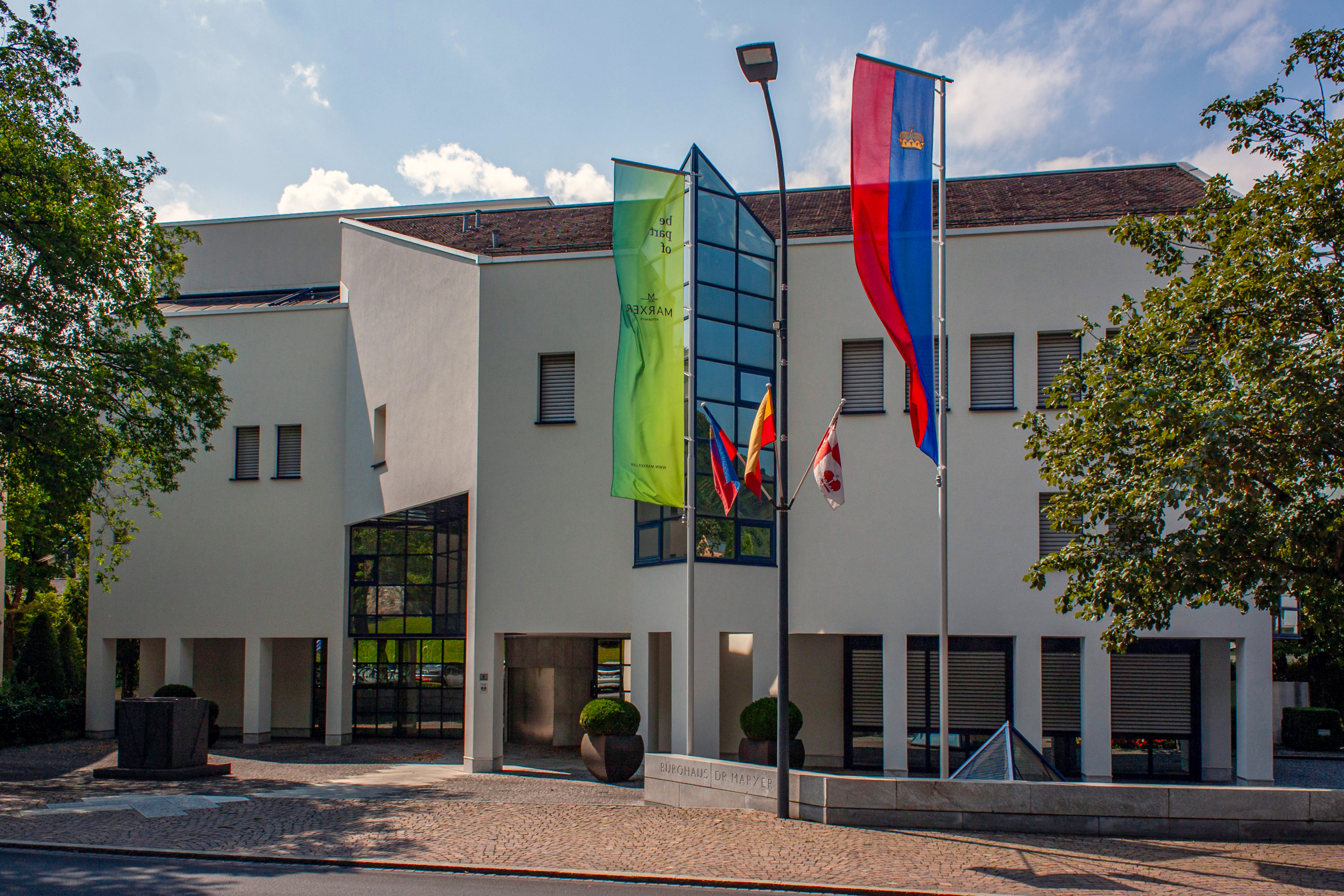
- Headquarters in Vaduz

Marxer & Partner Rechtsanwälte is a law firm based in Vaduz, Liechtenstein. It is the largest law firm in the country.

== History ==
The firm was founded in June 1925 by Ludwig Marxer. During the 1930s it looked after almost half of all foreigners who had naturalized in Liechtenstein, many of whom were Jewish. Due to this and a number of the firm's business partners also being Jewish, the firm became a target for attacks from German National Movement in Liechtenstein, a Nazi party in Liechtenstein. In 1940 the firm was the subject of a bombing attack. However, in 1943 the firm was placed under a trade embargo by the United Kingdom due to its cooperation with individuals associated with the war industry of Nazi Germany.

The firm remained small in size throughout Ludwig Marxer's life, with only seven employees in 1955. After his death in 1962 the firm was taken over by his son Peter Marxer, along with partners Adulf Peter Goop and Walter Kieber.

Peter Marxer (the son of the previous Peter Marxer), Peter Goop and Herbert Oberhuber and they are the current heads.

== Operations ==
Marxer & Partner Rechtsanwälte specialises in criminal law, corporate law, estate law and tax law along with banking regulation in the National Bank of Liechtenstein. It has also worked with commercial law firms in Germany, Austria and Sweden.

== Notable awards ==
The firm was ranked as a top-tier firm in The Legal 500's 2022 ranking.
