= Lorenz Ritter =

German painter

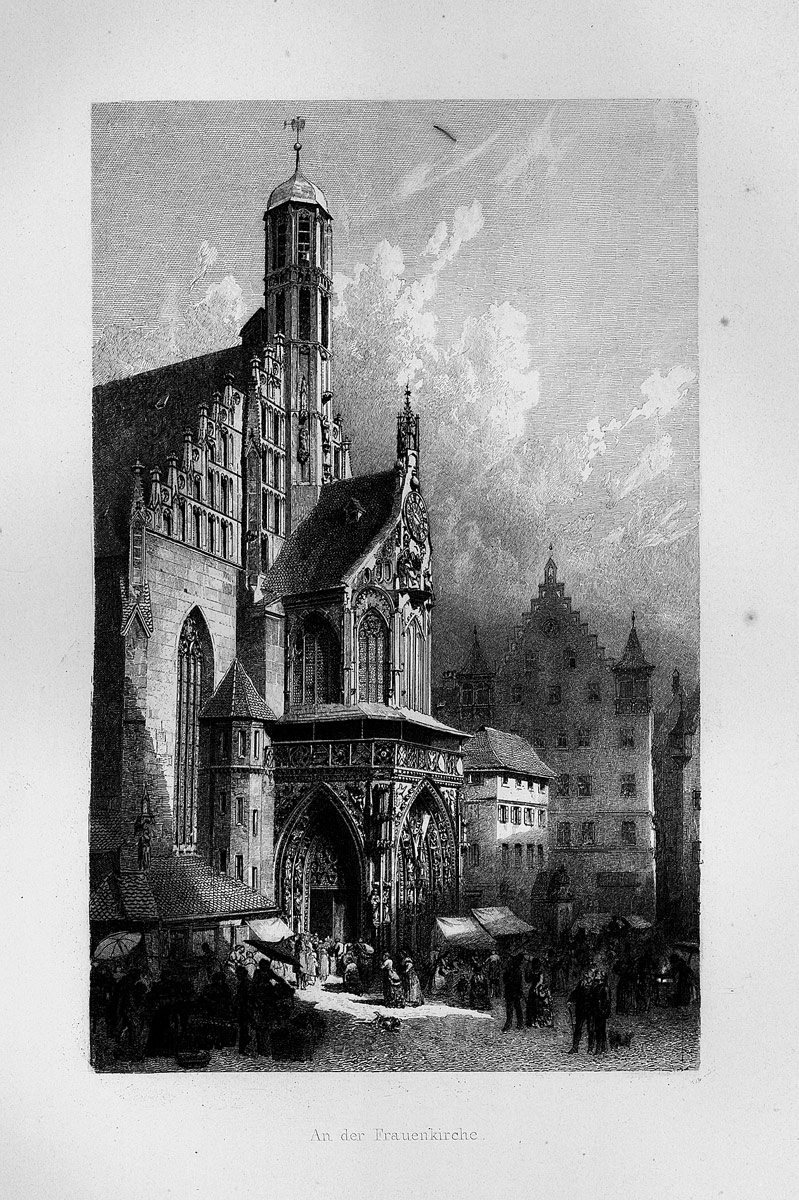
An der Frauenkirche from Lorenz Ritter's Malerische Ansichten aus Nürnberg (Painterly views from Nuremberg), Berlin: Wasmuth, 1876.

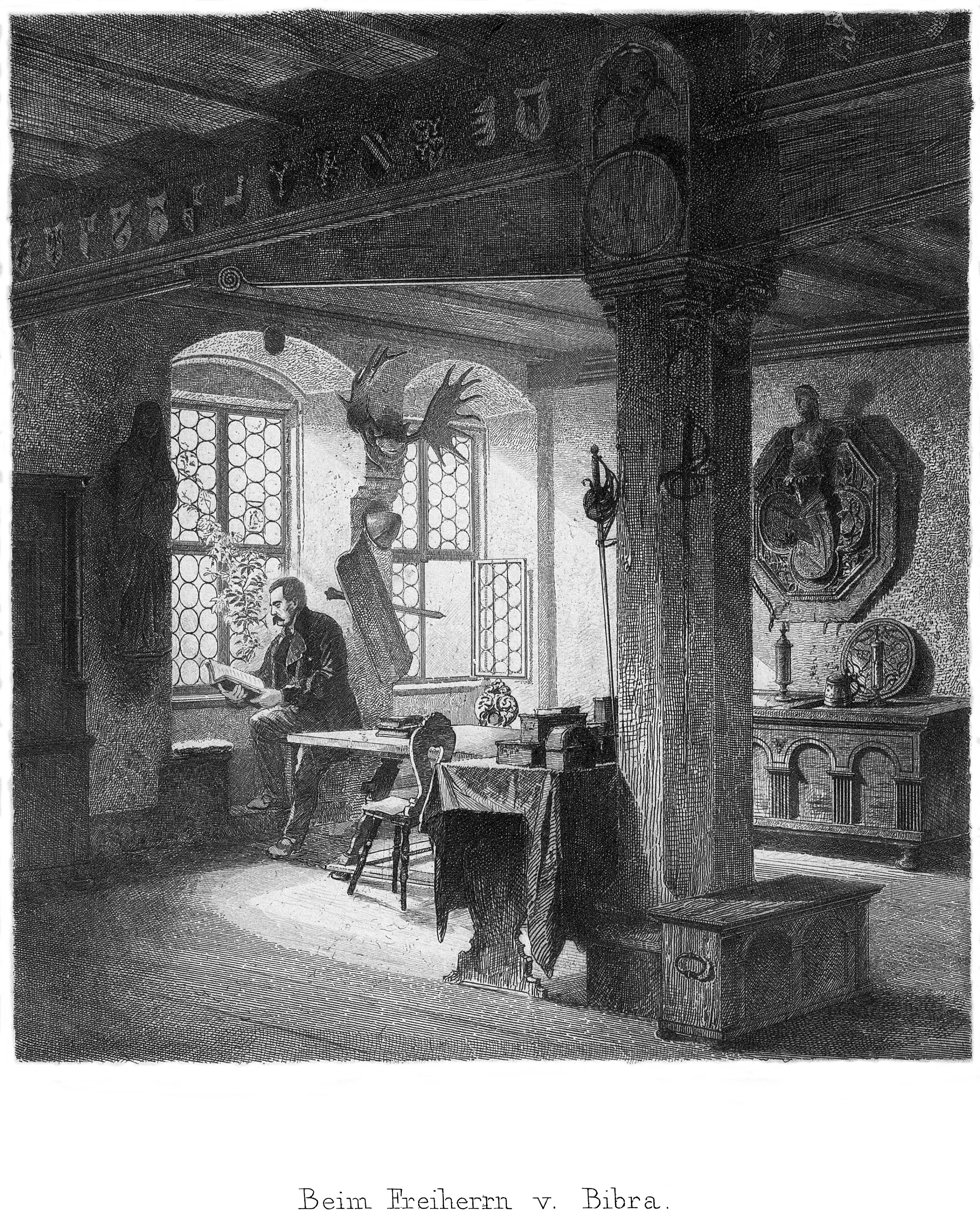
Beim Freiherrn von Bibra (Ernst von Bibra), Lorenz Ritter

Lorenz Ritter (24 November 1832 – 3 September 1921) was a German painter and etcher.

== Biography ==
He was born at Nuremberg, and a pupil of Heideloff. He painted chiefly in watercolors and etched numerous architectural views of Nuremberg and some subjects from North Italy. He died in Nuremberg.

== Family ==
His older brother, Paul Ritter, was also a painter.
