= Paul Ritter (painter) =

German painter

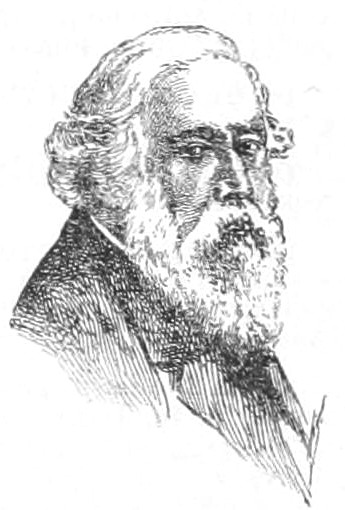
Sketch of Ritter, 1911

Paul Ritter (4 March 1829 – 27 November 1907) was a German architectural painter and etcher.

== Biography ==
Ritter was born at Nuremberg. He was deaf from the fourth year of his life. A pupil of Heideloff, he engraved for publishers in Berlin, Stuttgart, and Nuremberg. About 1870 he took up painting in oil. In 1888 the title of royal professor was conferred on him. He died in Nuremberg.

== Works ==
Ritter acquired considerable reputation with his interiors and street views of Nuremberg, richly supplemented with historical figures, such as:

- “Interior of Church of St. Lawrence” (1874)
- “Schöne Brunnen” (1880)
- “Entry of Procession with the Crown Jewels into Nuremberg in 1424” (1883, City Hall, Nuremberg)
- “Entry of Gustavus Adolphus in 1632” (1886)
- “Emperor Matthias Leaving the Kaiserburg in 1612” (1890)
- “Monument of Saint Sebaldus”

== Family ==
His younger brother, Lorenz Ritter, was also an artist.
