= Hannah Retter =

Hannah Retter (née Stickle, 1839–1940) was a New Zealand centenarian who was born two months before the signing of the Treaty of Waitangi. Of Māori descent, her mother was from the Ngāti Pariri hapū of the Muaūpoko iwi. She was born in Sydney, Australia in late 1839.
