= August Ritter (civil engineer) =

German professor and engineer

August Ritter (11 December 1826, in Lüneburg – 26 February 1908, in Lüneburg) was a German civil engineer.

== Biography ==
He was educated at the Polytechnic Institute at Hanover, and at Göttingen. He was a practicing engineer for some time, in 1856 became teacher of mechanics and construction of machinery at Hanover, in the Polytechnic Institute, and in 1870 became professor in the School of Technology at Aix-la-Chapelle. He is best known as the author of the method of sections of doing calculations for trusses, arches for bridges and roofs.

== Works ==
- Elementary Theory and Calculation of Iron Bridges and Roofs (German, 1863, 5th ed. 1894; Eng. by Sankey, 1879)
- Lehrbuch der technischen Mechanik (1864; 7th ed. 1896)
- Lehrbuch der Ingenieur-Mechanik (1874–76)
- Lehrbuch der analytischen Mechanik (2nd ed. 1883)
