= Index of structural engineering articles =

This is an alphabetical list of articles pertaining specifically to structural engineering. For a broad overview of engineering, please see List of engineering topics. For biographies please see List of engineers.

== A ==
A-frame – Aerodynamics – Aeroelasticity – Air-supported structure – Airframe – Aluminium – Analytical method – Angular frequency – Angular speed – Architecture – Architectural engineering – Arch – Arch bridge

== B ==
Base isolation – Beam – Beam axle – Bending – Bifurcation theory – Biomechanics – Boat Building – Body-on-frame – Box girder bridge – Box truss – Bridge engineering – Buckling – Building – Building construction – Building engineering

== C ==
Cable – Cable-stayed bridge – Cantilever – Cantilever bridge – Carbon-fiber-reinforced polymer – Casing – Casting – Catastrophic failure – Center of mass – Chaos theory – Chassis – Chimneys – Coachwork – Coefficient of thermal expansion – Coil spring – Columns – Composite material – Composite structure – Compression – Compressive stress – Concrete – Concrete cover – Construction – Construction engineering – Construction management – Continuum mechanics – Corrosion – Crane – Creep – Crumple zone – Curvature

== D ==
Dam – Damper – Damping ratio – Dead and live loads – Deflection – Deformation – Direct stiffness method – Dome – Double wishbone suspension – Duhamel's integral – Dynamical system – Dynamics

== E ==
Earthquake – Earthquake engineering – Earthquake engineering research – Earthquake engineering structures – Earthquake loss – Earthquake performance evaluation – Earthquake simulation – Elasticity theory – Elasticity – Energy principles in structural mechanics – Engineering mechanics – Euler method – Euler–Bernoulli beam equation

== F ==
Falsework – Fatigue – Fibre reinforced plastic – Finite element analysis – Finite element method – Finite element method in structural mechanics – Fire safety – Fire protection – Fire protection engineering – First moment of area – Flexibility method – Floating raft system – Floor – Fluid mechanics – Footbridges – Force – Formwork – Foundation engineering – Fracture – Fracture mechanics – Frame – Frequency – Fuselage

== G ==
Girder – Grout

== H ==
Hoist – Hollow structural section – Hooke's law – Hull – Hurricane-proof building – Hyperboloid structure

== I ==
Institution of Structural Engineers

== J ==
Joint

== L ==
Lattice tower – Lever – Leaf spring – Limit state design – Linear elasticity – Linear system – Linkage – Live axle – Load – Load factor

== M ==
MacPherson strut – Masonry – Mast – Material science – Modulus of elasticity – Mohr–Coulomb theory – Monocoque – Moment – Moment distribution – Moment of inertia – Mortar – Moulding

== N ==
Newton method – Newtonian mechanics – Non-linear system – Numerical analysis – Non-persistent joint

== O ==
Offshore engineering – Oscillation

== P ==
Permissible stress design – Pile – Plastic analysis – Plastic bending – plasticity – Poisson's ratio – Portland cement – Portal frame – Precast concrete – Prestressed concrete – Pressure vessel

== R ==
Radius of gyration – Ready-mix concrete – Rebar – Reinforced concrete – Response spectrum – Retaining wall – Rigid frame – Rotation

== S ==
Second moment of area – Seismic analysis – Seismic loading – Seismic performance – Seismic retrofit – Seismic risk – Shear – Shear flow – Shear modulus – Shear strain – Shear strength – Shear stress – Shear wall – Shipbuilding – Ship Construction – Shock absorbers – Shotcrete – Shrinkage – Simple machine – Skyscraper – Slab – Solid mechanics – Space frame – Statics – Statically determinate – Statically indeterminate – Statistical method – Steel – Stiffness – Strand jack – Strength of materials – Stress analysis – Stress–strain curve – Strut – Strut bar – Structural analysis – Structural design – Structural dynamics – Structural failure – Structural health monitoring – Structural load – Structural mechanics – Structural steel – Structural system – Subframe – Superleggera – Suspension (disambiguation page) – Suspension bridge

== T ==
Tall building – Tensile architecture – Tensile strength – Tensile stress – Tensile structure – Tension – Timber – Timber framing – Thermal conductivity – Thermal shock – Thermodynamics – Thermoplastic – Truss – Truss bridge – Torsion – Torsion beam suspension – Torsion box – Tower – Tubular bridge – Tuned mass damper

== U ==
Unit dummy force method – Unsprung weight

== V ==
Vehicle dynamics – Vessel – Very large floating structures – Vibration – Vibration control – Virtual work

== W ==
Wall – Wear – Wedge – Welding – Wheel and axle

== Y ==
Yield strength – Young's modulus
