= Francois Dubrulle =

French businessman and engineer

François Dubrulle
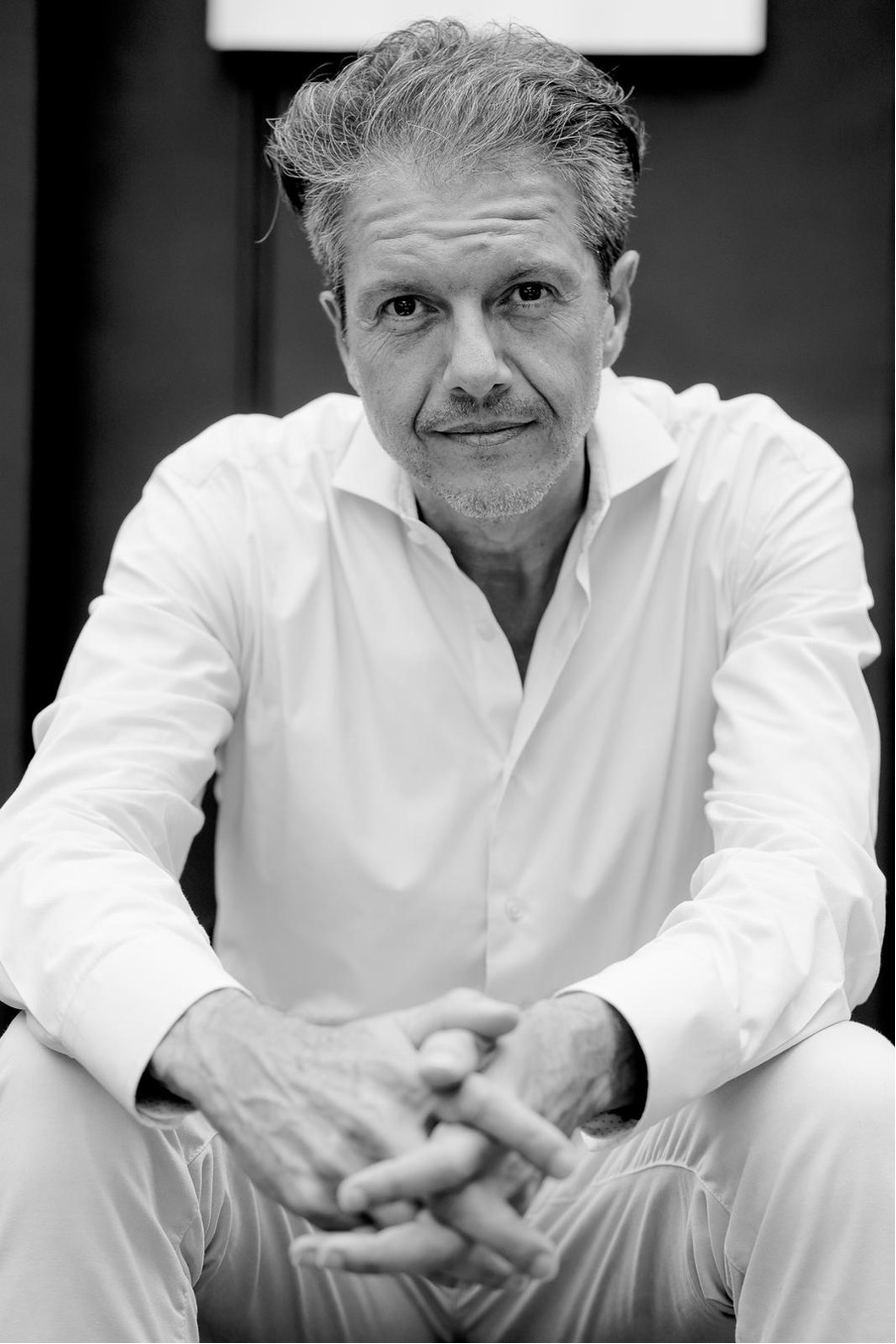
- Dubrulle in 2025
- Born: 1967 (age 58–59); Near Paris, France
- Education: Institut supérieur de l'aéronautique et de l'espace (ISAE-SUPAERO)
- Occupations: Businessman, engineer
- Years active: 1990–present
- Known for: Founder and CEO of space-tech company Qosmosys

François Dubrulle (born 1967) is a French businessman and engineer with a career predominantly in the deep-tech and aerospace industries.

He is the founder and CEO of space-tech company Qosmosys, a space technology company focused on lunar exploration and the development of technologies for space applications. Prior to founding Qosmosys, Dubrulle worked in the deep-tech and aerospace sectors. He has also theorized a framework for understanding business growth within organizations, emphasizing the importance of reforms to address conflicts of interest at all levels.

== Early life and education ==
Dubrulle was born in 1967 near Paris to Maryse Freland and Michel Dubrulle. His family has origins in northern France with branches in the United Kingdom, Canada, and Belgium. He graduated in 1991 from ISAE-SUPAERO.

== Professional career ==
Dubrulle began his career at Matra Marconi Space (now part of Airbus Defence & Space)in the early 1990s, where he gained experience in aerospace engineering systems and the risks associated with developing complex technologies. He subsequently expanded his focus to integrate technical knowledge with strategic business modeling. He has introduced several innovations in various sectors.

In 2021, Dubrulle founded Qosmosys, which aims to develop sustainable lunar infrastructure and foster international collaboration in space exploration. Qosmosys has become part of the global space industry, focusing on the ZeusX spacecraft, designed for the lunar economy in partnership with Airbus Defence & Space.

He has co-authored a book on finite element method, Calcul des structures par la méthode des éléments finis.

Dubrulle advocates a comprehensive overhaul of corporate governance, aiming to eradicate crony capitalism practices and create an environment that fosters both wealth generation and responsible risk-taking. He has voiced concerns about state intervention in private business, arguing that without solid counterparts, it leads to inefficiencies and stifle innovation.

In 2024, Dubrulle was featured in a mini-series by Bloomberg Media, produced in collaboration with HSBC, titled “Turning Point”, which highlighted his contributions to the space industry.

== Contributions to space exploration ==
He advocates a sustainable approach to space exploration, emphasizing projects that benefit both the lunar economy and humanity. Dubrulle is critical of large-scale Moon mining projects, considering them speculative and impractical.

== Recognition ==
In 2024, Dubrulle received an innovation prize from the Moon Village Association, highlighting his work on advancing the lunar economy.
