= Generalized forces =

Concept in Lagrangian mechanics

In analytical mechanics (particularly Lagrangian mechanics), generalized forces are conjugate to generalized coordinates. They are obtained from the applied forces F_{i}, i = 1, …, n, acting on a system that has its configuration defined in terms of generalized coordinates. In the formulation of virtual work, each generalized force is the coefficient of the variation of a generalized coordinate.

== Virtual work ==
Generalized forces can be obtained from the computation of the virtual work, δW, of the applied forces.

The virtual work of the forces, F_{i}, acting on the particles P_{i}, i = 1, ..., n, is given by $\delta W = \sum_{i=1}^n \mathbf F_i \cdot \delta \mathbf r_i$ where δr_{i} is the virtual displacement of the particle P_{i}.

=== Generalized coordinates ===
Let the position vectors of each of the particles, r_{i}, be a function of the generalized coordinates, q_{j}, j = 1, ..., m. Then the virtual displacements δr_{i} are given by $\delta \mathbf{r}_i = \sum_{j=1}^m \frac {\partial \mathbf {r}_i} {\partial q_j} \delta q_j,\quad i=1,\ldots, n,$ where δq_{j} is the virtual displacement of the generalized coordinate q_{j}.

The virtual work for the system of particles becomes $\delta W = \mathbf F_1 \cdot \sum_{j=1}^m \frac {\partial \mathbf r_1} {\partial q_j} \delta q_j + \dots + \mathbf F_n \cdot \sum_{j=1}^m \frac {\partial \mathbf r_n} {\partial q_j} \delta q_j.$ Collect the coefficients of δq_{j} so that $\delta W = \sum_{i=1}^n \mathbf F_i \cdot \frac {\partial \mathbf r_i} {\partial q_1} \delta q_1 + \dots + \sum_{i=1}^n \mathbf F_i \cdot \frac {\partial \mathbf r_i} {\partial q_m} \delta q_m.$

=== Generalized forces ===
The virtual work of a system of particles can be written in the form $\delta W = Q_1\delta q_1 + \dots + Q_m\delta q_m,$ where $Q_j = \sum_{i=1}^n \mathbf F_i \cdot \frac {\partial \mathbf r_i} {\partial q_j},\quad j=1,\ldots, m,$ are called the generalized forces associated with the generalized coordinates q_{j}, j = 1, ..., m.

=== Velocity formulation ===
In the application of the principle of virtual work it is often convenient to obtain virtual displacements from the velocities of the system. For the n particle system, let the velocity of each particle P_{i} be V_{i}, then the virtual displacement δr_{i} can also be written in the form $\delta \mathbf r_i = \sum_{j=1}^m \frac {\partial \mathbf V_i} {\partial \dot q_j} \delta q_j,\quad i=1,\ldots, n.$

This means that the generalized force, Q_{j}, can also be determined as $Q_j = \sum_{i=1}^n \mathbf F_i \cdot \frac {\partial \mathbf V_i} {\partial \dot{q}_j}, \quad j=1,\ldots, m.$

== D'Alembert's principle ==
D'Alembert formulated the dynamics of a particle as the equilibrium of the applied forces with an inertia force (apparent force), called D'Alembert's principle. The inertia force of a particle, P_{i}, of mass m_{i} is $\mathbf F_i^*=-m_i\mathbf A_i,\quad i=1,\ldots, n,$ where A_{i} is the acceleration of the particle.

If the configuration of the particle system depends on the generalized coordinates q_{j}, j = 1, ..., m, then the generalized inertia force is given by $Q^*_j = \sum_{i=1}^n \mathbf F^*_{i} \cdot \frac {\partial \mathbf V_i} {\partial \dot q_j},\quad j=1,\ldots, m.$

D'Alembert's form of the principle of virtual work yields $\delta W = (Q_1 + Q^*_1)\delta q_1 + \dots + (Q_m + Q^*_m)\delta q_m.$

== See also ==
- Lagrangian mechanics
- Generalized coordinates
- Degrees of freedom (physics and chemistry)
- Virtual work
