= Energy principles in structural mechanics =

Energy principles in structural mechanics express the relationships between stresses, strains or deformations, displacements, material properties, and external effects in the form of energy or work done by internal and external forces. Since energy is a scalar quantity, these relationships provide convenient and alternative means for formulating the governing equations of deformable bodies in solid mechanics. They can also be used for obtaining approximate solutions of fairly complex systems, bypassing the difficult task of solving the set of governing partial differential equations.

== General principles ==
- Virtual work principle
  - Principle of virtual displacements
  - Principle of virtual forces
    - Unit dummy force method
- Modified variational principles

== Elastic systems ==
- Minimum total potential energy principle
- Principle of stationary total complementary potential energy
- Castigliano's first theorem (for forces)

== Linear elastic systems ==
- Castigliano's second theorem (for displacements)
- Betti's reciprocal theorem
- Müller-Breslau's principle

== Applications ==
- Governing equations by variational principles
- Approximate solution methods
- Finite element method in structural mechanics

== Bibliography ==
- Charlton, T.M.; Energy Principles in Theory of Structures, Oxford University Press, 1973. ISBN 0-19-714102-1
- Dym, C. L. and I. H. Shames; Solid Mechanics: A Variational Approach, McGraw-Hill, 1973.
- Hu, H. Variational Principles of Theory of Elasticity With Applications; Taylor & Francis, 1984. ISBN 0-677-31330-6
- Langhaar, H. L.; Energy Methods in Applied Mechanics, Krieger, 1989.
- Moiseiwitsch, B. L.; Variational Principles, John Wiley and Sons, 1966. ISBN 0-470-61280-0
- Mura, T.; Variational Methods in Mechanics, Oxford University Press, 1992. ISBN 0-19-506830-0
- Reddy, J.N.; Energy Principles and Variational Methods in Applied Mechanics, John Wiley, 2002. ISBN 0-471-17985-X
- Shames, I. H. and Dym, C. L.; Energy and Finite Element Methods in Structural Mechanics, Taylor & Francis, 1995, ISBN 0-89116-942-3
- Tauchert, T.R.; Energy Principles in Structural Mechanics, McGraw-Hill, 1974. ISBN 0-07-062925-0
- Washizu, K.; Variational Methods in Elasticity and Plasticity, Pergamon Pr, 1982. ISBN 0-08-026723-8
- Wunderlich, W.; Mechanics of Structures: Variational and Computational Methods, CRC, 2002. ISBN 0-8493-0700-7
