= Virtual displacement =

Displacement in analytical mechanics

One degree of freedom.

Two degrees of freedom.

Constraint force C and virtual displacement δr for a particle of mass m confined to a curve. The resultant non-constraint force is N. The components of virtual displacement are related by a constraint equation.

In analytical mechanics, a branch of applied mathematics and physics, a virtual displacement (or infinitesimal variation) $\delta \gamma$ shows how the mechanical system's trajectory can hypothetically (hence the term virtual) deviate very slightly from the actual trajectory $\gamma$ of the system without violating the system's constraints. For every time instant $t,$ $\delta \gamma(t)$ is a vector tangential to the configuration space at the point $\gamma(t).$ The vectors $\delta \gamma(t)$ show the directions in which $\gamma(t)$ can "go" without breaking the constraints.

For example, the virtual displacements of the system consisting of a single particle on a two-dimensional surface fill up the entire tangent plane, assuming there are no additional constraints.

If, however, the constraints require that all the trajectories $\gamma$ pass through the given point $\mathbf{q}$ at the given time $\tau,$ i.e. $\gamma(\tau) = \mathbf{q},$ then $\delta\gamma (\tau) = 0.$

== Notations ==
Let $M$ be the configuration space of the mechanical system, $t_0,t_1 \in \mathbb{R}$ be time instants, $q_0,q_1 \in M,$ $C^\infty[t_0, t_1]$ consists of smooth functions on $[t_0, t_1]$, and

$$P(M) = \{\gamma \in C^\infty([t_0,t_1], M) \mid  \gamma(t_0)=q_0,\ \gamma(t_1)=q_1\}.$$

The constraints $\gamma(t_0)=q_0,$ $\gamma(t_1)=q_1$ are here for illustration only. In practice, for each individual system, an individual set of constraints is required.

== Definition ==
For each path $\gamma \in P(M)$ and $\epsilon_0 > 0,$ a variation of $\gamma$ is a smooth function $\Gamma : [t_0,t_1] \times [-\epsilon_0,\epsilon_0] \to M$ such that, for every $\epsilon \in [-\epsilon_0,\epsilon_0],$ $\Gamma(\cdot,\epsilon) \in P(M)$ and $\Gamma(t,0) = \gamma(t).$ The virtual displacement $\delta \gamma : [t_0,t_1] \to TM$ $(TM$ being the tangent bundle of $M)$ corresponding to the variation $\Gamma$ assigns to every $t \in [t_0,t_1]$ the tangent vector

$$\delta \gamma(t) = \left.\frac{d\Gamma(t,\epsilon)}{d\epsilon}\right|_{\epsilon=0} \in T_{\gamma(t)}M.$$

In terms of the tangent map,

$$\delta \gamma(t) = \Gamma^t_*\left(\left.\frac{d}{d\epsilon}\right|_{\epsilon=0}\right).$$

Here $\Gamma^t_*: T_0[-\epsilon,\epsilon] \to T_{\Gamma(t,0)}M = T_{\gamma(t)}M$ is the tangent map of $\Gamma^t : [-\epsilon,\epsilon] \to M,$ where $\Gamma^t(\epsilon) = \Gamma(t,\epsilon),$ and $\textstyle \frac{d}{d\epsilon}\Bigl|_{\epsilon = 0} \in T_0[-\epsilon,\epsilon].$

== Properties ==
- Coordinate representation. If $\{q_i\}^n_{i=1}$ are the coordinates in an arbitrary chart on $M$ and $n = \dim M,$ then
  $$\delta \gamma(t) = \sum^n_{i=1} \frac{d[q_i(\Gamma(t,\epsilon))]}{d\epsilon}\Biggl|_{\epsilon=0} \cdot \frac{d}{dq_i}\Biggl|_{\gamma(t)}.$$
- If, for some time instant $\tau$ and every $\gamma \in P(M),$ $\gamma(\tau)=\text{const},$ then, for every $\gamma \in P(M),$ $\delta \gamma (\tau) = 0.$
- If $\textstyle \gamma,\frac{d\gamma}{dt} \in P(M),$ then $\delta \frac{d\gamma}{dt} = \frac{d}{dt}\delta \gamma.$

== Examples ==
=== Free particle in R^{3} ===
A single particle freely moving in $\mathbb{R}^3$ has 3 degrees of freedom. The configuration space is $M = \mathbb{R}^3,$ and $P(M) = C^\infty([t_0,t_1], M).$ For every path $\gamma \in P(M)$ and a variation $\Gamma(t,\epsilon)$ of $\gamma,$ there exists a unique $\sigma \in T_0\mathbb{R}^3$ such that $\Gamma(t,\epsilon) = \gamma(t) + \sigma(t) \epsilon + o(\epsilon),$ as $\epsilon \to 0.$ By the definition,

$$\delta \gamma (t) = \left.\left(\frac{d}{d\epsilon} \Bigl(\gamma(t) + \sigma(t)\epsilon + o(\epsilon)\Bigr)\right)\right|_{\epsilon=0}$$

which leads to

$$\delta \gamma (t) = \sigma(t) \in T_{\gamma(t)} \mathbb{R}^3.$$

=== Free particles on a surface ===
$N$ particles moving freely on a two-dimensional surface $S \subset \mathbb{R}^3$ have $2N$ degree of freedom. The configuration space here is

$$M = \{(\mathbf{r}_1, \ldots, \mathbf{r}_N) \in \mathbb{R}^{3\, N} \mid \mathbf{r}_i \in \mathbb{R}^3;\ \mathbf{r}_i \neq \mathbf{r}_j\ \text{if}\ i \neq j\},$$

where $\mathbf{r}_i \in \mathbb{R}^3$ is the radius vector of the $i^\text{th}$ particle. It follows that

$$T_{(\mathbf{r}_1, \ldots, \mathbf{r}_N)} M = T_{\mathbf{r}_1}S \oplus \ldots \oplus T_{\mathbf{r}_N}S,$$

and every path $\gamma \in P(M)$ may be described using the radius vectors $\mathbf{r}_i$ of each individual particle, i.e.

$$\gamma (t) = (\mathbf{r}_1(t),\ldots, \mathbf{r}_N(t)).$$

This implies that, for every $\delta \gamma(t) \in T_{(\mathbf{r}_1(t), \ldots, \mathbf{r}_N(t))} M,$

$$\delta \gamma(t) = \delta \mathbf{r}_1(t) \oplus \ldots \oplus \delta \mathbf{r}_N(t),$$

where $\delta \mathbf{r}_i(t) \in T_{\mathbf{r}_i(t)} S.$ Some authors express this as

$$\delta \gamma = (\delta \mathbf{r}_1, \ldots , \delta \mathbf{r}_N).$$

=== Rigid body rotating around fixed point ===
A rigid body rotating around a fixed point with no additional constraints has 3 degrees of freedom. The configuration space here is $M = SO(3),$ the special orthogonal group of dimension 3 (otherwise known as 3D rotation group), and $P(M) = C^\infty([t_0,t_1], M).$ We use the standard notation $\mathfrak{so}(3)$ to refer to the three-dimensional linear space of all skew-symmetric three-dimensional matrices. The exponential map $\exp : \mathfrak{so}(3) \to SO(3)$ guarantees the existence of $\epsilon_0 > 0$ such that, for every path $\gamma \in P(M),$ its variation $\Gamma(t,\epsilon),$ and $t \in [t_0,t_1],$ there is a unique path $\Theta^t \in C^\infty([-\epsilon_0, \epsilon_0], \mathfrak{so}(3))$ such that $\Theta^t(0) = 0$ and, for every $\epsilon \in [-\epsilon_0,\epsilon_0],$ $\Gamma(t,\epsilon) = \gamma(t)\exp(\Theta^t(\epsilon)).$ By the definition,

$$\delta \gamma (t) = \left.\left(\frac{d}{d\epsilon} \Bigl(\gamma(t) \exp(\Theta^t(\epsilon))\Bigr)\right)\right|_{\epsilon=0}
= \gamma(t) \left.\frac{d\Theta^t(\epsilon)}{d\epsilon}\right|_{\epsilon=0}.$$

Since, for some function $\sigma : [t_0,t_1]\to \mathfrak{so}(3),$ $\Theta^t(\epsilon) = \epsilon\sigma(t) + o(\epsilon)$, as $\epsilon \to 0$,

$$\delta \gamma (t) = \gamma(t)\sigma(t) \in T_{\gamma(t)}\mathrm{SO}(3).$$

== See also ==
- D'Alembert principle
- Virtual work
