= Unit dummy force method =

The Unit dummy force method provides a convenient means for computing displacements in structural systems. It is applicable for both linear and non-linear material behaviours as well as for systems subject to environmental effects, and hence more general than Castigliano's second theorem.

== Discrete systems ==
Consider a discrete system such as trusses, beams or frames having members interconnected at the nodes. Let the consistent set of members' deformations be given by $\mathbf{q}_{M \times 1}$, which can be computed using the member flexibility relation. These member deformations give rise to the nodal displacements $\mathbf{r}_{N \times 1}$, which we want to determine.

We start by applying N virtual nodal forces $\mathbf{R}^*_{N \times 1}$, one for each wanted r, and find the virtual member forces $\mathbf{Q}^*_{M \times 1}$ that are in equilibrium with $\mathbf{R}^*_{N \times 1}$:

$$\mathbf{Q}^*_{M \times 1} = \mathbf{B}_{M \times N} \mathbf{R}^*_{N \times 1}$$	1

In the case of a statically indeterminate system, matrix B is not unique because the set of $\mathbf{Q}^*_{M \times 1}$ that satisfies nodal equilibrium is infinite. It can be computed as the inverse of the nodal equilibrium matrix of any primary system derived from the original system.

Imagine that internal and external virtual forces undergo, respectively, the real deformations and displacements; the virtual work done can be expressed as:

- External virtual work: $\mathbf{R}^{*T} \mathbf{r}$
- Internal virtual work: $\mathbf{Q}^{*T} \mathbf{q}$

According to the virtual work principle, the two work expressions are equal:
$$\mathbf{R}^{*T} \mathbf{r} = \mathbf{Q}^{*T} \mathbf{q}$$

Substitution of (1) gives
$$\mathbf{R}^{*T} \mathbf{r} = \mathbf{R}^{*T} \mathbf{B}^{T} \mathbf{q} .$$

Since $\mathbf{R}^{*}$ contains arbitrary virtual forces, the above equation gives

$$\mathbf{r} = \mathbf{B}^{T} \mathbf{q}$$	2

It is remarkable that the computation in (2) does not involve any integration regardless of the complexity of the systems, and that the result is unique irrespective of the choice of primary system for B. It is thus far more convenient and general than the classical form of the dummy unit load method, which varies with the type of system as well as with the imposed external effects. On the other hand, Eq.(2) is for computing displacements or rotations of the nodes only. This is not a restriction because we can make any point into a node when desired.

Finally, the name unit load arises from the interpretation that the coefficients $B_{i,j}$ in matrix B are the member forces in equilibrium with the unit nodal force $R^*_j = 1$, by virtue of Eq.(1).

== General systems ==
For a general system, the unit dummy force method also comes directly from the virtual work principle. Fig.(a) shows a system with known actual deformations $\boldsymbol{\epsilon}$. These deformations, supposedly consistent, give rise to displacements throughout the system. For example, a point A has moved to A', and we want to compute the displacement r of A in the direction shown. For this particular purpose, we choose the virtual force system in Fig.(b) which shows:

- The unit force R* is at A and in the direction of r so that the external virtual work done by R* is, noting that the work done by the virtual reactions in (b) is zero because their displacements in (a) are zero:
  $$R^* \times r = 1 \times r$$
  is the desired displacement
- The internal virtual work done by the virtual stresses is
  $$\int_V \boldsymbol{\epsilon}^T \boldsymbol{\sigma}^* dV$$
  where the virtual stresses $\boldsymbol{\sigma}^*$ must satisfy equilibrium everywhere.

Equating the two work expressions gives the desired displacement:
$$1 \times r = \int_V \boldsymbol{\epsilon}^T \boldsymbol{\sigma}^* dV$$
