= Virtual work =

Work done by a force to move a particle along a virtual displacement

In mechanics, virtual work arises in the application of the principle of least action to the study of forces and movement of a mechanical system. The work of a force acting on a particle as it moves along a displacement is different for different displacements. Among all the possible displacements that a particle may follow, called virtual displacements, one will minimize the action. This displacement is therefore the displacement followed by the particle according to the principle of least action.

The work of a force on a particle along a virtual displacement is known as the virtual work.

Historically, virtual work and the associated calculus of variations were formulated to analyze systems of rigid bodies, but they have also been developed for the study of the mechanics of deformable bodies.

== History ==
The principle of virtual work had always been used in some form since antiquity in the study of statics. It was used by the Greeks, medieval Arabs and Latins, and Renaissance Italians as "the law of lever". The idea of virtual work was invoked by many notable physicists of the 17th century, such as Galileo, Descartes, Torricelli, Wallis, and Huygens, in varying degrees of generality, when solving problems in statics. Working with Leibnizian concepts, Johann Bernoulli systematized the virtual work principle and made explicit the concept of infinitesimal displacement. He was able to solve problems for both rigid bodies as well as fluids. Bernoulli's version of virtual work law appeared in his letter to Pierre Varignon in 1715, which was later published in Varignon's second volume of Nouvelle mécanique ou Statique in 1725. This formulation of the principle is today known as the principle of virtual velocities and is commonly considered as the prototype of the contemporary virtual work principles. In 1743 D'Alembert published his Traité de Dynamique where he applied the principle of virtual work, based on Bernoulli's work, to solve various problems in dynamics. His idea was to convert a dynamical problem into static problem by introducing inertial force. In 1768, Lagrange presented the virtual work principle in a more efficient form by introducing generalized coordinates and presented it as an alternative principle of mechanics by which all problems of equilibrium could be solved. A systematic exposition of Lagrange's program of applying this approach to all of mechanics, both static and dynamic, essentially D'Alembert's principle, was given in his Mécanique Analytique of 1788. Although Lagrange had presented his version of least action principle prior to this work, he recognized the virtual work principle to be more fundamental mainly because it could be assumed alone as the foundation for all mechanics, unlike the modern understanding that least action does not account for non-conservative forces.

== Overview ==
If a force acts on a particle as it moves from point $A$ to point $B$, then, for each possible trajectory that the particle may take, it is possible to compute the total work done by the force along the path. The principle of virtual work, which is the form of the principle of least action applied to these systems, states that the path actually followed by the particle is the one for which the difference between the work along this path and other nearby paths is zero (to the first order). The formal procedure for computing the difference of functions evaluated on nearby paths is a generalization of the derivative known from differential calculus, and is termed the calculus of variations.

Consider a point particle that moves along a path which is described by a function $\mathbf{r}(t)$ from point $A$, where $\mathbf{r}(t)=t_0$, to point $B$, where $\mathbf{r}(t)=t_1$. It is possible that the particle moves from $A$ to $B$ along a nearby path described by $\mathbf{r}(t) + \delta \mathbf{r}(t)$, where $\delta \mathbf{r}(t)$ is called the variation of $\mathbf{r}(t)$. The variation $\delta \mathbf{r}(t)$ satisfies the requirement $\delta \mathbf{r}(t_0) = \delta \mathbf{r}(t_1) = 0$. The scalar components of the variation $\delta r_1(t)$, $\delta r_2(t)$ and $\delta r_3(t)$ are called virtual displacements. This can be generalized to an arbitrary mechanical system defined by the generalized coordinates $q_i$, $i = 1,2,...,n$. In which case, the variation of the trajectory $q_i(t)$ is defined by the virtual displacements $\delta q_i$, $i = 1,2,...,n$.

Virtual work is the total work done by the applied forces and the inertial forces of a mechanical system as it moves through a set of virtual displacements. When considering forces applied to a body in static equilibrium, the principle of least action requires the virtual work of these forces to be zero.

== Mathematical treatment ==
Consider a particle P that moves from a point A to a point B along a trajectory r(t), while a force F(r(t)) is applied to it. The work done by the force F is given by the integral
$$W = \int_{\mathbf{r}(t_0)=A}^{\mathbf{r}(t_1)=B} \mathbf{F} \cdot d\mathbf{r} = \int_{t_0}^{t_1} \mathbf{F} \cdot \frac{d\mathbf{r}}{dt}~dt = \int_{t_0}^{t_1}\mathbf{F} \cdot \mathbf{v} ~ dt,$$
where dr is the differential element along the curve that is the trajectory of P, and v is its velocity. It is important to notice that the value of the work W depends on the trajectory r(t).

Now consider particle P that moves from point A to point B again, but this time it moves along the nearby trajectory that differs from r(t) by the variation δr(t) = εh(t), where ε is a scaling constant that can be made as small as desired and h(t) is an arbitrary function that satisfies h(t_{0}) = h(t_{1}) = 0. Suppose the force F(r(t) + εh(t)) is the same as F(r(t)). The work done by the force is given by the integral
$$\bar{W} = \int_{\mathbf{r}(t_0)=A}^{\mathbf{r}(t_1)=B} \mathbf{F} \cdot d(\mathbf{r}+\varepsilon \mathbf{h}) = \int_{t_0}^{t_1} \mathbf{F} \cdot \frac{d(\mathbf{r}(t) + \varepsilon\mathbf{h}(t))}{dt}~ dt = \int_{t_0}^{t_1}\mathbf{F} \cdot (\mathbf{v} + \varepsilon \dot{\mathbf{h}}) ~ dt .$$
The variation of the work δW associated with this nearby path, known as the virtual work, can be computed to be
$$\delta W = \bar{W}-W = \int_{t_0}^{t_1} (\mathbf{F} \cdot \varepsilon \dot{\mathbf{h}}) ~dt.$$

If there are no constraints on the motion of P, then 3 parameters are needed to completely describe P's position at any time t. If there are k (k ≤ 3) constraint forces, then n = (3 − k) parameters are needed. Hence, we can define n generalized coordinates q_{i} (t) (i = 1,...,n), and express r(t) and δr = εh(t) in terms of the generalized coordinates. That is,
$$\mathbf{r}(t) = \mathbf{r}(q_1,q_2,\dots,q_n;t),$$
$$\mathbf{h}(t) = \mathbf{h}(q_1,q_2,\dots,q_n;t).$$
Then, the derivative of the variation δr = εh(t) is given by
$$\frac{d}{dt} \delta \mathbf{r} = \frac{d}{dt} \varepsilon\mathbf{h} = \sum_{i=1}^n \frac{\partial \mathbf{h}}{\partial q_i} \varepsilon \dot{q}_i,$$
then we have
$$\delta W = \int_{t_0}^{t_1} \left(\sum_{i=1}^n \mathbf{F} \cdot \frac{\partial\mathbf{h}}{\partial q_i} \varepsilon \dot{q}_i\right) dt = \sum_{i=1}^n \left(\int_{t_0}^{t_1} \mathbf{F} \cdot \frac{\partial\mathbf{h}}{\partial q_i} \varepsilon\dot{q}_i ~dt\right).$$

The requirement that the virtual work be zero for an arbitrary variation δr(t) = εh(t) is equivalent to the set of requirements
$$Q_i = \mathbf{F} \cdot \frac{\partial \mathbf{h}}{\partial q_i} = 0, \quad i=1, \ldots, n.$$
The terms Q_{i} are called the generalized forces associated with the virtual displacement δr.

== Static equilibrium ==
Static equilibrium is a state in which the net force and net torque acted upon the system is zero. In other words, both linear momentum and angular momentum of the system are conserved. The principle of virtual work states that the virtual work of the applied forces is zero for all virtual movements of the system from static equilibrium. This principle can be generalized such that three dimensional rotations are included: the virtual work of the applied forces and applied moments is zero for all virtual movements of the system from static equilibrium. That is
$$\delta W = \sum_{i=1}^m \mathbf{F}_i \cdot \delta\mathbf{r}_i + \sum_{j=1}^n \mathbf{M}_j \cdot \delta\mathbf{\varphi}_j = 0 ,$$
where F_{i} , i = 1, 2, ..., m and M_{j} , j = 1, 2, ..., n are the applied forces and applied moments, respectively, and δr_{i} , i = 1, 2, ..., m and δφ_{j}, j = 1, 2, ..., n are the virtual displacements and virtual rotations, respectively.

Suppose the system consists of N particles, and it has f (f ≤ 6N) degrees of freedom. It is sufficient to use only f coordinates to give a complete description of the motion of the system, so f generalized coordinates q_{k} , k = 1, 2, ..., f are defined such that the virtual movements can be expressed in terms of these generalized coordinates. That is,
$$\delta \mathbf{r}_i (q_1, q_2, \dots, q_f; t), \quad i = 1, 2, \dots, m ;$$
$$\delta \phi_j (q_1, q_2, \dots, q_f; t), \quad j = 1, 2, \dots, n .$$

The virtual work can then be reparametrized by the generalized coordinates:
$$\delta W = \sum_{k=1}^f \left[ \left( \sum_{i=1}^m \mathbf{F}_i \cdot \frac{\partial \mathbf{r}_i}{\partial q_k} + \sum_{j=1}^n \mathbf{M}_j \cdot \frac{\partial \mathbf{\phi}_j}{\partial q_k} \right) \delta q_k \right] = \sum_{k=1}^f Q_k \delta q_k ,$$
where the generalized forces Q_{k} are defined as
$$Q_k = \sum_{i=1}^m \mathbf{F}_i \cdot \frac{\partial \mathbf{r}_i}{\partial q_k} + \sum_{j=1}^n \mathbf{M}_j \cdot \frac{\partial \mathbf{\phi}_j}{\partial q_k} , \quad k = 1, 2, \dots, f .$$
Kane shows that these generalized forces can also be formulated in terms of the ratio of time derivatives. That is,
$$Q_k = \sum_{i=1}^m \mathbf{F}_i \cdot \frac{\partial \mathbf{v}_i}{\partial \dot{q}_k} + \sum_{j=1}^n \mathbf{M}_j \cdot \frac{\partial \mathbf{\omega}_j}{\partial \dot{q}_k} , \quad k = 1, 2, \dots, f .$$

The principle of virtual work requires that the virtual work done on a system by the forces F_{i} and moments M_{j} vanishes if it is in equilibrium. Therefore, the generalized forces Q_{k} are zero, that is
$$\delta W=0 \quad \Rightarrow \quad Q_k = 0 \quad k =1, 2, \dots, f .$$

=== Constraint forces ===
An important benefit of the principle of virtual work is that only forces that do work as the system moves through a virtual displacement are needed to determine the mechanics of the system. There are many forces in a mechanical system that do no work during a virtual displacement, which means that they need not be considered in this analysis. The two important examples are (i) the internal forces in a rigid body, and (ii) the constraint forces at an ideal joint.

Lanczos presents this as the postulate: "The virtual work of the forces of reaction is always zero for any virtual displacement which is in harmony with the given kinematic constraints." The argument is as follows. The principle of virtual work states that in equilibrium the virtual work of the forces applied to a system is zero. Newton's laws state that at equilibrium the applied forces are equal and opposite to the reaction, or constraint forces. This means the virtual work of the constraint forces must be zero as well.

== Law of the lever ==
A lever is modeled as a rigid bar connected to a ground frame by a hinged joint called a fulcrum. The lever is operated by applying an input force F_{A} at a point A located by the coordinate vector r_{A} on the bar. The lever then exerts an output force F_{B} at the point B located by r_{B}. The rotation of the lever about the fulcrum P is defined by the rotation angle θ.

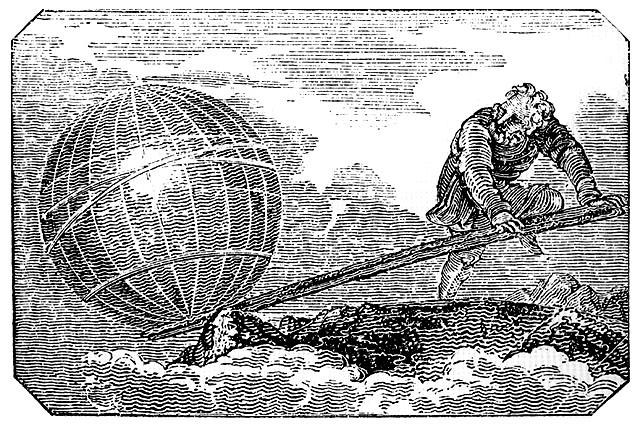
This is an engraving from Mechanics Magazine published in London in 1824.

Let the coordinate vector of the point P that defines the fulcrum be r_{P}, and introduce the lengths
$$a = |\mathbf{r}_A -  \mathbf{r}_P|, \quad  b = |\mathbf{r}_B -  \mathbf{r}_P|,$$
which are the distances from the fulcrum to the input point A and to the output point B, respectively.

Now introduce the unit vectors e_{A} and e_{B} from the fulcrum to the point A and B, so
$$\mathbf{r}_A -  \mathbf{r}_P = a\mathbf{e}_A, \quad \mathbf{r}_B - \mathbf{r}_P = b\mathbf{e}_B.$$
This notation allows us to define the velocity of the points A and B as
$$\mathbf{v}_A = \dot{\theta} a \mathbf{e}_A^\perp, \quad  \mathbf{v}_B = \dot{\theta} b \mathbf{e}_B^\perp,$$
where e_{A}^{⊥} and e_{B}^{⊥} are unit vectors perpendicular to e_{A} and e_{B}, respectively.

The angle θ is the generalized coordinate that defines the configuration of the lever, therefore using the formula above for forces applied to a one degree-of-freedom mechanism, the generalized force is given by
$$Q =  \mathbf{F}_A \cdot \frac{\partial\mathbf{v}_A}{\partial\dot{\theta}} - \mathbf{F}_B \cdot \frac{\partial\mathbf{v}_B}{\partial\dot{\theta}} = a(\mathbf{F}_A \cdot \mathbf{e}_A^\perp) - b(\mathbf{F}_B \cdot \mathbf{e}_B^\perp).$$

Now, denote as F_{A} and F_{B} the components of the forces that are perpendicular to the radial segments PA and PB. These forces are given by
$$F_A = \mathbf{F}_A \cdot \mathbf{e}_A^\perp, \quad  F_B = \mathbf{F}_B \cdot \mathbf{e}_B^\perp.$$
This notation and the principle of virtual work yield the formula for the generalized force as
$$Q = a F_A - b F_B = 0.$$

The ratio of the output force F_{B} to the input force F_{A} is the mechanical advantage of the lever, and is obtained from the principle of virtual work as
$$MA = \frac{F_B}{F_A} = \frac{a}{b}.$$

This equation shows that if the distance a from the fulcrum to the point A where the input force is applied is greater than the distance b from fulcrum to the point B where the output force is applied, then the lever amplifies the input force. If the opposite is true that the distance from the fulcrum to the input point A is less than from the fulcrum to the output point B, then the lever reduces the magnitude of the input force.

This is the law of the lever, which was proven by Archimedes using geometric reasoning.

== Gear train ==
A gear train is formed by mounting gears on a frame so that the teeth of the gears engage. Gear teeth are designed to ensure the pitch circles of engaging gears roll on each other without slipping, this provides a smooth transmission of rotation from one gear to the next. For this analysis, we consider a gear train that has one degree-of-freedom, which means the angular rotation of all the gears in the gear train are defined by the angle of the input gear.

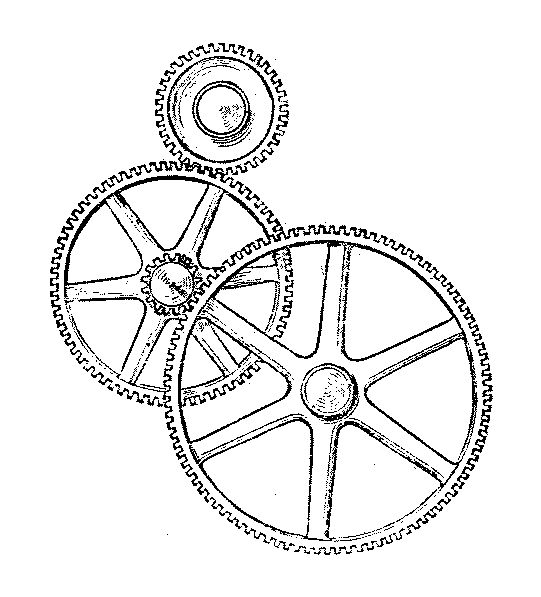
Illustration from Army Service Corps Training on Mechanical Transport, (1911), Fig. 112 Transmission of motion and force by gear wheels, compound train

The size of the gears and the sequence in which they engage define the ratio of the angular velocity ω_{A} of the input gear to the angular velocity ω_{B} of the output gear, known as the speed ratio, or gear ratio, of the gear train. Let R be the speed ratio, then
$$\frac{\omega_A}{\omega_B} = R.$$

The input torque T_{A} acting on the input gear G_{A} is transformed by the gear train into the output torque T_{B} exerted by the output gear G_{B}. If we assume, that the gears are rigid and that there are no losses in the engagement of the gear teeth, then the principle of virtual work can be used to analyze the static equilibrium of the gear train.

Let the angle θ of the input gear be the generalized coordinate of the gear train, then the speed ratio R of the gear train defines the angular velocity of the output gear in terms of the input gear, that is
$$\omega_A = \omega, \quad \omega_B = \omega/R.$$

The formula above for the principle of virtual work with applied torques yields the generalized force
$$Q = T_A \frac{\partial\omega_A}{\partial\omega} - T_B \frac{\partial \omega_B}{\partial\omega} = T_A - T_B/R = 0.$$

The mechanical advantage of the gear train is the ratio of the output torque T_{B} to the input torque T_{A}, and the above equation yields
$$MA = \frac{T_B}{T_A} = R.$$

Thus, the speed ratio of a gear train also defines its mechanical advantage. This shows that if the input gear rotates faster than the output gear, then the gear train amplifies the input torque. And, if the input gear rotates slower than the output gear, then the gear train reduces the input torque.

== Dynamic equilibrium for rigid bodies ==
If the principle of virtual work for applied forces is used on individual particles of a rigid body, the principle can be generalized for a rigid body: When a rigid body that is in equilibrium is subject to virtual compatible displacements, the total virtual work of all external forces is zero; and conversely, if the total virtual work of all external forces acting on a rigid body is zero then the body is in equilibrium.

If a system is not in static equilibrium, D'Alembert showed that by introducing the acceleration terms of Newton's laws as inertia forces, this approach is generalized to define dynamic equilibrium. The result is D'Alembert's form of the principle of virtual work, which is used to derive the equations of motion for a mechanical system of rigid bodies.

The expression compatible displacements means that the particles remain in contact and displace together so that the work done by pairs of action/reaction inter-particle forces cancel out. Various forms of this principle have been credited to Johann (Jean) Bernoulli (1667–1748) and Daniel Bernoulli (1700–1782).

=== Generalized inertia forces ===
Let a mechanical system be constructed from n rigid bodies, B_{i}, i=1,...,n, and let the resultant of the applied forces on each body be the force-torque pairs, F_{i} and T_{i}, i = 1,...,n. Notice that these applied forces do not include the reaction forces where the bodies are connected. Finally, assume that the velocity V_{i} and angular velocities ω_{i}, i=1,...,n, for each rigid body, are defined by a single generalized coordinate q. Such a system of rigid bodies is said to have one degree of freedom.

Consider a single rigid body which moves under the action of a resultant force F and torque T, with one degree of freedom defined by the generalized coordinate q. Assume the reference point for the resultant force and torque is the center of mass of the body, then the generalized inertia force Q* associated with the generalized coordinate q is given by
$$Q^* = -(M\mathbf{A}) \cdot  \frac{\partial \mathbf{V}}{\partial \dot{q}} - ([I_R]\alpha+ \omega\times[I_R]\omega) \cdot \frac{\partial \boldsymbol{\omega}}{\partial \dot{q}}.$$
This inertia force can be computed from the kinetic energy of the rigid body,
$$T = \frac{1}{2} M \mathbf{V} \cdot \mathbf{V} + \frac{1}{2} \boldsymbol{\omega} \cdot [I_R] \boldsymbol{\omega},$$
by using the formula
$$Q^* = -\left(\frac{d}{dt} \frac{\partial T}{\partial \dot{q}} -\frac{\partial T}{\partial q}\right).$$

A system of n rigid bodies with m generalized coordinates has the kinetic energy
$$T = \sum_{i=1}^n \left(\frac{1}{2} M \mathbf{V}_i \cdot \mathbf{V}_i + \frac{1}{2} \boldsymbol{\omega}_i \cdot [I_R] \boldsymbol{\omega}_i\right),$$
which can be used to calculate the m generalized inertia forces
$$Q^*_j = -\left(\frac{d}{dt} \frac{\partial T}{\partial \dot{q}_j} -\frac{\partial T}{\partial q_j}\right), \quad j=1, \ldots, m.$$

=== D'Alembert's form of the principle of virtual work ===
D'Alembert's form of the principle of virtual work states that a system of rigid bodies is in dynamic equilibrium when the virtual work of the sum of the applied forces and the inertial forces is zero for any virtual displacement of the system. Thus, dynamic equilibrium of a system of n rigid bodies with m generalized coordinates requires that
$$\delta W = (Q_1 + Q^*_1)\delta q_1 + \dots + (Q_m + Q^*_m)\delta q_m = 0,$$
for any set of virtual displacements δq_{j}. This condition yields m equations,
$$Q_j + Q^*_j = 0, \quad j=1, \ldots, m,$$
which can also be written as
$$\frac{d}{dt} \frac{\partial T}{\partial \dot{q}_j} -\frac{\partial T}{\partial q_j} = Q_j, \quad j=1,\ldots,m.$$
The result is a set of m equations of motion that define the dynamics of the rigid body system, known as Lagrange's equations or the generalized equations of motion.

If the generalized forces Q_{j} are derivable from a potential energy V(q_{1},...,q_{m}), then these equations of motion take the form
$$\frac{d}{dt} \frac{\partial T}{\partial \dot{q}_j} -\frac{\partial T}{\partial q_j} = -\frac{\partial V}{\partial q_j}, \quad j=1,\ldots,m.$$

In this case, introduce the Lagrangian, L = T − V, so these equations of motion become
$$\frac{d}{dt} \frac{\partial L}{\partial \dot{q}_j} - \frac{\partial L}{\partial q_j} = 0 \quad j=1,\ldots,m.$$
These are known as the Euler–Lagrange equations for a system with m degrees of freedom, or Lagrange's equations of the second kind.

== Virtual work principle for a deformable body ==
Consider now the free body diagram of a deformable body, which is composed of an infinite number of differential cubes. Let's define two unrelated states for the body:

- The $\boldsymbol{\sigma}$-State: This shows external surface forces T, body forces f, and internal stresses $\boldsymbol{\sigma}$ in equilibrium.
- The $\boldsymbol{\epsilon}$-State: This shows continuous displacements $\mathbf {u}^*$ and consistent strains $\boldsymbol{\epsilon}^*$.

The superscript * emphasizes that the two states are unrelated. Other than the above stated conditions, there is no need to specify if any of the states are real or virtual.

Imagine now that the forces and stresses in the $\boldsymbol{\sigma}$-State undergo the displacements and deformations in the $\boldsymbol{\epsilon}$-State: We can compute the total virtual (imaginary) work done by all forces acting on the faces of all cubes in two different ways:

- First, by summing the work done by forces such as $F_A$ which act on individual common faces (Fig.c): Since the material experiences compatible displacements, such work cancels out, leaving only the virtual work done by the surface forces T (which are equal to stresses on the cubes' faces, by equilibrium).
- Second, by computing the net work done by stresses or forces such as $F_A$, $F_B$ which act on an individual cube, e.g. for the one-dimensional case in Fig.(c):
  $$F_B \left( u^* + \frac{ \partial u^*}{\partial x} dx \right ) - F_A u^* \approx  \frac{ \partial u^* }{\partial x} \sigma dV + u^* \frac{ \partial \sigma }{\partial x} dV = \epsilon^* \sigma dV - u^* f dV$$
  where the equilibrium relation $\frac{ \partial \sigma }{\partial x}+f=0$ has been used and the second order term has been neglected.
  Integrating over the whole body gives:
  $$\int_{V} \boldsymbol{\epsilon}^{*T} \boldsymbol{\sigma} \, dV$$
  – Work done by the body forces f.

Equating the two results leads to the principle of virtual work for a deformable body:

$$\text{Total external virtual work} = \int_{V} \boldsymbol{\epsilon}^{*T} \boldsymbol{\sigma} dV$$	d

where the total external virtual work is done by T and f. Thus,

$$\int_{S} \mathbf{u}^{*T} \mathbf{T} dS + \int_{V} \mathbf{u}^{*T} \mathbf{f} dV = \int_{V} \boldsymbol{\epsilon}^{*T} \boldsymbol{\sigma} dV$$	e

The right-hand-side of (d,e) is often called the internal virtual work. The principle of virtual work then states: External virtual work is equal to internal virtual work when equilibrated forces and stresses undergo unrelated but consistent displacements and strains. It includes the principle of virtual work for rigid bodies as a special case where the internal virtual work is zero.

=== Proof of equivalence between the principle of virtual work and the equilibrium equation ===
We start by looking at the total work done by surface traction on the body going through the specified deformation:
$$\int_{S} \mathbf u \cdot \mathbf T dS = \int_{S} \mathbf u \cdot \boldsymbol \sigma \cdot \mathbf n dS$$

Applying divergence theorem to the right hand side yields:
$$\int_S \mathbf{u \cdot \boldsymbol \sigma \cdot n} dS = \int_V \nabla \cdot \left( \mathbf{u} \cdot \boldsymbol \sigma \right) dV$$

Now switch to indicial notation for the ease of derivation.
$$\begin{align}
\int_V \nabla \cdot \left( \mathbf{u} \cdot \boldsymbol \sigma \right) dV
&= \int_V \frac{\partial}{\partial x_j} \left( u_i \sigma_{ij} \right) dV \\
&= \int_V \left( \frac{\partial u_i}{\partial x_j} \sigma_{ij} + u_i \frac{\partial \sigma_{ij}}{\partial x_j}\right) dV
\end{align}$$

To continue our derivation, we substitute in the equilibrium equation $\frac{\partial \sigma_{ij}}{\partial x_j} + f_i = 0$. Then
$$\int_V \left(\frac{\partial u_i}{\partial x_j} \sigma_{ij} + u_i \frac{\partial \sigma_{ij}}{\partial x_j}\right) dV
= \int_V \left(\frac{\partial u_i}{\partial x_j} \sigma_{ij} - u_i f_i\right) dV$$

The first term on the right hand side needs to be broken into a symmetric part and a skew part as follows:
$$\begin{align}
\int_V\left( \frac{\partial u_i}{\partial x_j} \sigma_{ij} - u_i f_i\right) dV
&= \int_V\left( \frac12 \left[ \left( \frac{\partial u_i}{\partial x_j} + \frac{\partial u_j}{\partial x_i} \right)
+ \left( \frac{\partial u_i}{\partial x_j} - \frac{\partial u_j}{\partial x_i} \right) \right] \sigma_{ij} - u_i f_i \right) dV \\
&= \int_V \left( \left[ \epsilon_{ij}
+ \frac12 \left( \frac{\partial u_i}{\partial x_j} - \frac{\partial u_j}{\partial x_i} \right) \right] \sigma_{ij} - u_i f_i\right)  dV \\
&= \int_V\left( \epsilon_{ij} \sigma_{ij} - u_i f_i \right) dV\\
&= \int_V \left( \boldsymbol\epsilon : \boldsymbol\sigma - \mathbf u \cdot \mathbf f \right)  dV
\end{align}$$
where $\boldsymbol\epsilon$ is the strain that is consistent with the specified displacement field. The 2nd to last equality comes from the fact that the stress matrix is symmetric and that the product of a skew matrix and a symmetric matrix is zero.

Now recap. We have shown through the above derivation that
$$\int_{S} \mathbf{u \cdot T} dS = \int_V \boldsymbol\epsilon : \boldsymbol\sigma dV - \int_V \mathbf u \cdot \mathbf f dV$$

Move the 2nd term on the right hand side of the equation to the left:
$$\int_{S} \mathbf{u \cdot T} dS + \int_V \mathbf u \cdot \mathbf f dV = \int_V \boldsymbol\epsilon : \boldsymbol\sigma dV$$

The physical interpretation of the above equation is, the External virtual work is equal to internal virtual work when equilibrated forces and stresses undergo unrelated but consistent displacements and strains.

For practical applications:

- In order to impose equilibrium on real stresses and forces, we use consistent virtual displacements and strains in the virtual work equation.
- In order to impose consistent displacements and strains, we use equilibriated virtual stresses and forces in the virtual work equation.

These two general scenarios give rise to two often stated variational principles. They are valid irrespective of material behaviour.

=== Principle of virtual displacements ===
Depending on the purpose, we may specialize the virtual work equation. For example, to derive the principle of virtual displacements in variational notations for supported bodies, we specify:

- Virtual displacements and strains as variations of the real displacements and strains using variational notation such as $\delta\ \mathbf {u} \equiv \mathbf{u}^*$ and $\delta\ \boldsymbol {\epsilon} \equiv \boldsymbol {\epsilon}^*$
- Virtual displacements be zero on the part of the surface that has prescribed displacements, and thus the work done by the reactions is zero. There remains only external surface forces on the part $S_t$ that do work.

The virtual work equation then becomes the principle of virtual displacements:

$$\int_{S_t} \delta\ \mathbf{u}^T \mathbf{T} dS + \int_{V} \delta\ \mathbf{u}^T \mathbf{f} dV = \int_{V}\delta\boldsymbol{\epsilon}^T \boldsymbol{\sigma} dV$$	f

This relation is equivalent to the set of equilibrium equations written for a differential element in the deformable body as well as of the stress boundary conditions on the part $S_t$ of the surface. Conversely, (f) can be reached, albeit in a non-trivial manner, by starting with the differential equilibrium equations and the stress boundary conditions on $S_t$, and proceeding in the manner similar to (a) and (b).

Since virtual displacements are automatically compatible when they are expressed in terms of continuous, single-valued functions, we often mention only the need for consistency between strains and displacements. The virtual work principle is also valid for large real displacements; however, Eq.(f) would then be written using more complex measures of stresses and strains.

=== Principle of virtual forces ===
Here, we specify:

- Virtual forces and stresses as variations of the real forces and stresses.
- Virtual forces be zero on the part $S_t$ of the surface that has prescribed forces, and thus only surface (reaction) forces on $S_u$ (where displacements are prescribed) would do work.

The virtual work equation becomes the principle of virtual forces:

$$\int_{S_u} \mathbf{u}^T \delta\ \mathbf{T} dS + \int_{V} \mathbf{u}^T \delta\ \mathbf{f} dV = \int_{V} \boldsymbol{\epsilon}^T \delta \boldsymbol{\sigma} dV$$	g

This relation is equivalent to the set of strain-compatibility equations as well as of the displacement boundary conditions on the part $S_u$. It has another name: the principle of complementary virtual work.

== Alternative forms ==
A specialization of the principle of virtual forces is the unit dummy force method, which is very useful for computing displacements in structural systems. According to D'Alembert's principle, inclusion of inertial forces as additional body forces will give the virtual work equation applicable to dynamical systems. More generalized principles can be derived by:

- allowing variations of all quantities.
- using Lagrange multipliers to impose boundary conditions and/or to relax the conditions specified in the two states.

These are described in some of the references.

Among the many energy principles in structural mechanics, the virtual work principle deserves a special place due to its generality that leads to powerful applications in structural analysis, solid mechanics, and finite element method in structural mechanics.

== See also ==
- Flexibility method
- Unit dummy force method
- Finite element method in structural mechanics
- Calculus of variations
- Lagrangian mechanics
- Müller-Breslau's principle
- D'Alembert's principle

== Bibliography ==
- Bathe, K.J. "Finite Element Procedures", Prentice Hall, 1996. ISBN 0-13-301458-4
- Charlton, T.M. Energy Principles in Theory of Structures, Oxford University Press, 1973. ISBN 0-19-714102-1
- Dym, C. L. and I. H. Shames, Solid Mechanics: A Variational Approach, McGraw-Hill, 1973.
- Greenwood, Donald T. Classical Dynamics, Dover Publications Inc., 1977, ISBN 0-486-69690-1
- Hu, H. Variational Principles of Theory of Elasticity With Applications, Taylor & Francis, 1984. ISBN 0-677-31330-6
- Langhaar, H. L. Energy Methods in Applied Mechanics, Krieger, 1989.
- Reddy, J.N. Energy Principles and Variational Methods in Applied Mechanics, John Wiley, 2002. ISBN 0-471-17985-X
- Shames, I. H. and Dym, C. L. Energy and Finite Element Methods in Structural Mechanics, Taylor & Francis, 1995, ISBN 0-89116-942-3
- Tauchert, T.R. Energy Principles in Structural Mechanics, McGraw-Hill, 1974. ISBN 0-07-062925-0
- Washizu, K. Variational Methods in Elasticity and Plasticity, Pergamon Pr, 1982. ISBN 0-08-026723-8
- Wunderlich, W. Mechanics of Structures: Variational and Computational Methods, CRC, 2002. ISBN 0-8493-0700-7
