= Statically indeterminate =

When a structure's static equilibrium equations have no unique solution

Statically indeterminate is a condition when the equilibrium equations – force and moment equilibrium conditions – are insufficient for determining the internal forces and reactions on that structure. The term, and its opposite, statically determinate, are used in statics, structural mechanics, and mechanical engineering.

== Mathematics ==
Based on Newton's laws of motion, the equilibrium equations available for a two-dimensional body are:

$\sum \mathbf F = 0 :$ the vectorial sum of the forces acting on the body equals zero. This translates to:

$\sum \mathbf H = 0 :$ the sum of the horizontal components of the forces equals zero;
$\sum \mathbf V = 0 :$ the sum of the vertical components of forces equals zero;

$\sum \mathbf M = 0 :$ the sum of the moments (about an arbitrary point) of all forces equals zero.

Free body diagram of a statically indeterminate beam

In the beam construction on the right, the four unknown reactions are V_{A}, V_{B}, V_{C}, and H_{A}. The equilibrium equations are:

$$\begin{align}
\sum \mathbf V = 0 \quad & \implies \quad \mathbf V_A - \mathbf F_v + \mathbf V_B + \mathbf V_C = 0 \\
\sum \mathbf H = 0 \quad & \implies \quad \mathbf H_A = 0 \\
\sum \mathbf M_A = 0 \quad & \implies \quad \mathbf F_v \cdot a - \mathbf V_B \cdot (a + b) - \mathbf V_C \cdot (a + b + c) = 0
\end{align}$$

Since there are four unknown forces (or variables) (V_{A}, V_{B}, V_{C}, and H_{A}) but only three equilibrium equations, this system of simultaneous equations does not have a unique solution. The structure is therefore classified as statically indeterminate.

To solve statically indeterminate systems (determine the various moment and force reactions within it), one considers the material properties and compatibility in deformations.

== Statically determinate ==
If the support at B is removed, the reaction V_{B} cannot occur, and the system becomes statically determinate (or isostatic). Note that the system is completely constrained here. The system becomes an exact constraint kinematic coupling. The solution to the problem is:

$$\begin{align}
\mathbf H_A &= \mathbf F_h \\
\mathbf V_C &= \frac{\mathbf F_v \cdot a}{a + b + c} \\
\mathbf V_A &= \mathbf F_v - \mathbf V_C
\end{align}$$

If, in addition, the support at A is changed to a roller, the system can be moved horizontally, making it a mechanism rather than a structure, and reducing the number of reactions to three (without H_{A}). As a result, the system becomes unstable or partly constrained, with the latter term preferable in distinguishing between this condition and when a system under equilibrium becomes unstable through a perturbation. In this case, the two unknowns V_{A} and V_{C} can be determined by resolving the vertical force equation and the moment equation simultaneously. The solution yields the same results as previously obtained. However, it is not possible to satisfy the horizontal force equation unless F_{h} = 0.

== Statical determinacy ==
Descriptively, a statically determinate structure can be defined as a structure where, if it is possible to find internal actions in equilibrium with external loads, those internal actions are unique. The structure has no possible states of self-stress, i.e. internal forces in equilibrium with zero external loads are not possible. Statical indeterminacy, however, is the existence of a non-trivial (non-zero) solution to the homogeneous system of equilibrium equations. It indicates the possibility of self-stress (stress in the absence of an external load) that may be induced by mechanical or thermal action.

Mathematically, this requires a stiffness matrix to have full rank.

A statically indeterminate structure can only be analyzed by including further information like material properties and deflections. Numerically, this can be achieved by using matrix structural analyses, finite element method (FEM) or the moment distribution method (Hardy Cross) .

Practically, a structure is called 'statically overdetermined' when it comprises more mechanical constraints – like walls, columns or bolts – than absolutely necessary for stability.

== See also ==
- Christian Otto Mohr
- Flexibility method
- Kinematic determinacy
- Overconstrained mechanism
- Structural engineering
