= Graphic statics =

Graphical methods for solving problems in statics

Graphic statics, or graphical statics, uses geometrical constructions to solve problems in statics. The graphical reduction of a plane system of forces involves the construction of a force diagram and a funicular polygon. The force polygon built with the diagram gives the magnitude and direction of the resultant force, and the funicular gives its line of action. The same constructions can be used to find the forces at the supports of a loaded beam and the bending moment along it.

Graphic statics was widely used in nineteenth-century architecture. Its use declined during the twentieth century as numerical methods based on linear algebra became established for reinforced concrete frames. Computer-aided design brought renewed interest in the subject by allowing changes in structural form and force to be displayed together.

== History ==
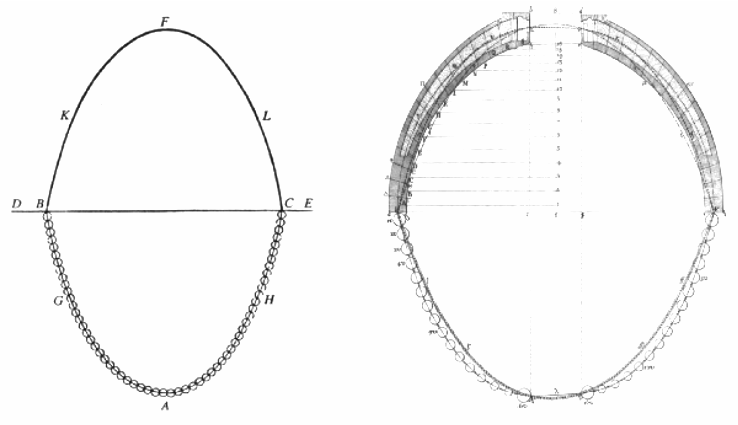
Poleni's analysis of the dome of St Peter's Basilica (right)

Graphical approaches to forces preceded graphic statics as a distinct discipline. Markou and Ruan trace this history through Leonardo da Vinci, Galileo Galilei, Simon Stevin's parallelogram of forces, and Pierre Varignon's force and funicular polygons of 1725. They describe applications to domes by Giovanni Poleni in 1748 at Saint Peter's Basilica and by Gabriel Lamé and Émile Clapeyron in 1823 at Saint Isaac's Cathedral.

Carl Culmann established the discipline in his Die graphische Statik (Graphic Statics), drawing on work by Jean-Victor Poncelet and August Ferdinand Möbius. James Clerk Maxwell and William John Macquorn Rankine subsequently developed graphical methods. Luigi Cremona's work of 1872 concerned truss analysis; the following year, Robert H. Bow published the notation used to relate the diagrams.

Graphic statics has also been used in engineering education. Mueller, Fivet and Ochsendorf described classroom applications of graphical tools in 2015. Courses at the Massachusetts Institute of Technology and ETH Zurich have included the subject.

== Concepts ==
=== Polygon of forces ===
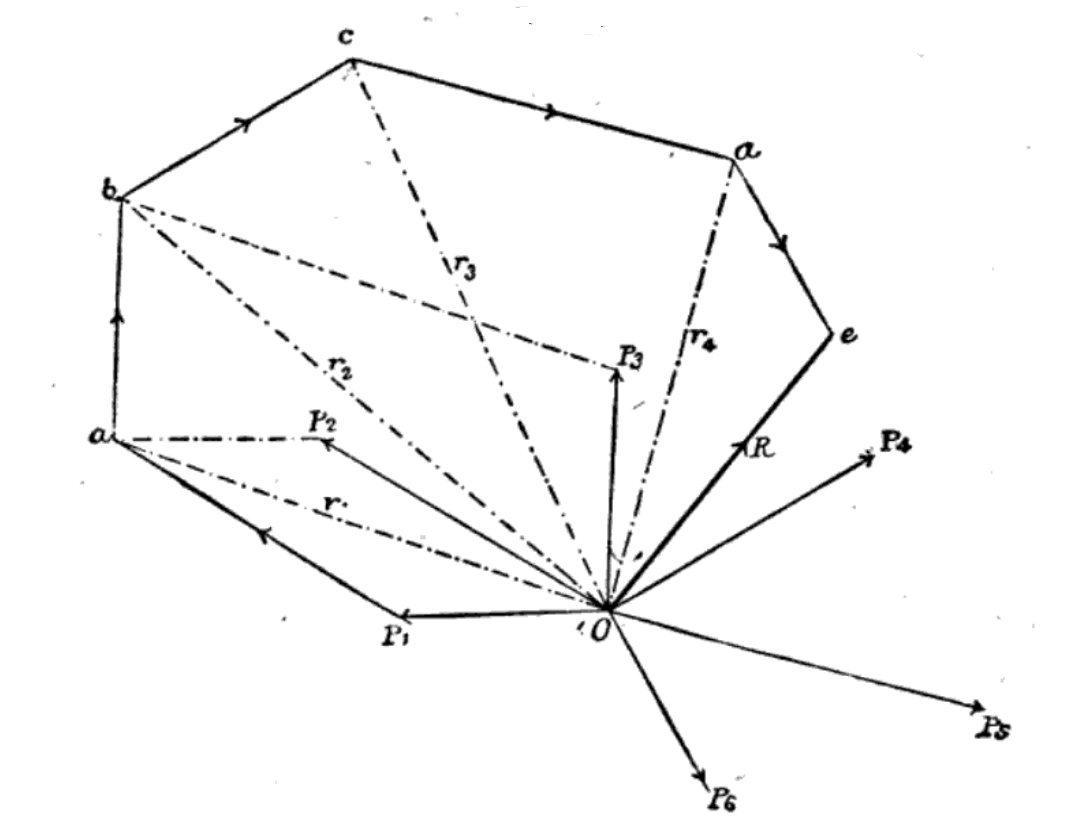
A force polygon for the forces P_{1} to P_{6} applied at O. The vector from O to e represents their resultant R.

A force is represented by a straight line drawn in its direction, of length proportional, on any convenient scale, to its magnitude. The force diagram is constructed by placing end to end a series of vectors representing the given forces. They form successive edges of a polygon, and the vector from the first point to the last represents their resultant. For two forces, this is equivalent to the parallelogram of forces.

In the illustration, the forces P_{1} to P_{6} act at O. Adding P_{1} and P_{2} gives the vertex a; adding P_{3} gives b, and so on. The vector from O to e represents the resultant R. The vector in the reverse direction would close the polygon and represents a force that balances the given forces. If the polygon is already closed, the vector sum is zero. For forces acting at a single point, this is the condition of equilibrium.

=== Funicular polygon ===
A funicular polygon (left) and its force diagram (right). Corresponding lines carry the same numbers. The first and last sides of the funicular meet on the line of action of the resultant R.

For forces whose lines of action do not all pass through one point, a second construction locates the resultant. In the force diagram, the vertices of the force polygon are joined to an arbitrary point O, called the pole. The funicular, or link polygon, has its vertices on the lines of action of the given forces. Its sides are parallel to the corresponding lines drawn from O in the force diagram. In particular, the two sides meeting at any vertex are parallel to the lines drawn from O to the ends of the vector representing the force at that vertex. The funicular polygon drawn for compression forces (say, in an analysis of an arch) is called a pressure polygon.

The forces may be taken in any order. The position of the pole is arbitrary, and even for a fixed pole different funicular polygons can be drawn by changing the position of the first side. Each force can be replaced by two components acting along the sides of the funicular that meet on its line of action. The corresponding triangle in the force diagram gives the magnitudes of these components.

When this process of replacement is complete, the two forces along each intermediate side of the funicular neutralize one another. There remain only two uncompensated forces, acting in the first and last sides of the funicular. If these sides intersect, the resultant passes through their intersection. Its magnitude and direction are given by the vector joining the first point of the force polygon to the last.

The construction also has a mechanical interpretation. Jointed bars in the shape of the funicular can be in equilibrium under the forces applied at their joints, with the end forces included. A bar under tension, rather than compression, may be replaced by a string. This gives the names link polygon and funicular polygon.

=== Conditions of equilibrium ===
If the force polygon is closed, its first and last points coincide. The first and last sides of the funicular are then parallel, unless they coincide. If they are distinct parallel lines, the two remaining forces form a couple: equal and opposite forces with a turning effect. If the sides coincide, the forces cancel and the system is in equilibrium. Thus the necessary and sufficient conditions of equilibrium for a plane system of forces are that the force polygon and the funicular polygon should both be closed.

=== Reciprocal figures and Bow's notation ===
Reciprocal figures. A line separating two lettered regions in the left figure is parallel to the line joining the corresponding points in the right figure.

Two plane figures are called reciprocal when corresponding lines are parallel, and lines meeting at a point in either figure correspond to the sides of a closed polygon in the other. The relation works in both directions. Forces acting at a single point in equilibrium, together with their closed force polygon, provide a simple example.

The geometry also relates different funicular polygons for the same forces. If two poles O and O′ are chosen in the force diagram, corresponding sides of the two funiculars intersect on a straight line parallel to OO′. When one funicular has been drawn, any other can be constructed by this theorem without further reference to the force diagram.

Maxwell studied the theory of reciprocal figures. He showed that a reciprocal could be drawn for a figure obtained by orthogonal projection of a polyhedron with plane faces. His construction also gives a form of reciprocity in which corresponding lines are perpendicular rather than parallel.

In Bow's notation the points in one figure are designated by letters A, B, C, and so on, and the corresponding polygons in the other figure by the same letters. A line joining points A and B in the first diagram then corresponds to the side separating regions A and B in the second. Bow used this notation in the analysis of frames.

== Applications ==
=== Reactions at the supports of a beam ===
A loaded beam, its funicular polygon, and its force diagram. AB, BC, and CD represent the downward loads; DE and EA represent the upward reactions.

When all the forces are parallel, the force polygon consists of segments of a straight line. This case can be used to find the reactions at the supports of a beam. In the illustration, the successive segments AB, BC, and CD represent the downward loads. Lines from a pole O to A, B, C, and D determine the directions of the sides of the funicular.

The closing line joins the points where the funicular meets the lines of action of the two support reactions. A line OE, parallel to this closing line, is drawn in the force diagram. The segments DE and EA then give the upward reactions of the supports on the beam. Together with the loads, these reactions form a system in equilibrium. The forces of the beam on the supports have the opposite directions, ED and AE.

=== Moments and bending moments ===
Graphical construction of the moment of a force F about P. The similar triangles OAB and RHK relate the force diagram to the funicular.

A graphical method can also be applied to find the moment, or turning effect, of a force or a system of forces about any assigned point P. Let F be a force represented by AB in the force diagram. Draw a parallel through P to meet the sides of the funicular corresponding to OA and OB at H and K. If R is the intersection of these sides, the triangles OAB and RHK are similar. With perpendiculars OM and RN drawn as shown,

$$HK\cdot OM=AB\cdot RN=F\cdot RN.$$

Here RN is the perpendicular distance from P to the line of action of F. The product F · RN is the magnitude of the moment. In reading the construction, AB and OM use the force scale, while HK and RN use the length scale.

If the given forces are all vertical, OM is the same for all, and the moments of the several forces about P are represented on a certain scale by the lengths intercepted by successive pairs of sides on the vertical through P. The moments are compounded by adding the corresponding lengths HK, with their signs. Hence, if a system of vertical forces is in equilibrium, so that the funicular polygon is closed, the length which this polygon intercepts on the vertical through P gives, on this scale, the sum of the moments about P of all the forces on one side of the vertical.

In the case of a beam in equilibrium under given loads and the reactions at the supports, the funicular represents the distribution of bending moment over the beam. The construction can be adjusted so that the closing line is horizontal; the figure then becomes identical with the bending-moment diagram on the chosen scale. To study the effects of a movable load, or system of loads moving together, in different positions on the beam, it is only necessary to shift the lines of action of the support reactions relatively to the funicular, keeping them at the same distance apart. The only change is then in the position of the closing line of the funicular.

=== Centre of parallel forces ===
The centre of a system of parallel forces of given magnitudes acting at fixed points can also be found graphically. The lines of action of the resultant are constructed for two different common directions of the forces, such as two directions at right angles. Their intersection gives the centre through which the resultant passes as the forces are turned together. A finite, definite centre requires a nonzero resultant. When the forces represent parallel weights, this is the centre of gravity.

=== Form finding ===
The previous sections outline applications of graphic statics to find forces in a structure of known geometry. Form finding is an application of graphic statics that reverses this. Using form finding a structure's geometry is derived from the defined physical forces and load case.

For the funicular polygon force diagram, moving the pole can generate an infinite number of funiculars, all achieving equilibrium but with different shapes. A number of different standard pole positions indicate different loading conditions. For example: lengthening the pole horizontally increases a horizontal thrust; the larger thrust gives a flatter form, and the smaller thrust a deeper one. Changing the vertical pole position affects the closing line; and a higher position tilts it further.

Designers have used graphic statics for form finding in real structures. Robert Maillart’s Salginatobel Bridge (1930) form was reached through graphic statics processes. These included finding parabolas that minimize bending moments, and defining the foundation block geometrically. A more recent example is the Collier Memorial (2015) where early structural design stages were heavily influenced by graphic statics.

=== Computational graphic statics ===
Computational graphic statics uses algorithms to construct and modify linked form and force diagrams. As in traditional graphic statics, the form diagram represents structural geometry and the lines of action of forces, while the force diagram represents force magnitudes and equilibrium. Interactive software updates the diagrams as the designer changes the geometry or forces. For two-dimensional structures, the diagrams can be constructed using algebraic equations or geometric constraints. Other methods extend graphic statics to three dimensions.

Van Mele and Block's algebraic graph statics expresses reciprocal relationship of form and force diagrams as matrix equations. It builds a force diagram from a two-dimensional form and specified loading or self-stress conditions. Fivet and Zastavni's geometric method has node positions confined to defined regions. The diagrams can be changed within these constraints while keeping the forces in equilibrium. Designers can use the method to arrange struts and ties and determine the forces they carry before undertaking a detailed structural analysis.

Three-dimensional extensions include polyhedron-based and vector-based approaches. Building on Rankine's principle of equilibrium of polyhedral frames, Akbarzadeh and colleagues developed reciprocal polyhedral diagrams for compression-only or tension-only spatial structures. Each structural member corresponds to a perpendicular face in the force diagram, with the face area proportional to the force magnitude. Closed polyhedral cells represent equilibrium at individual structural nodes.

In vector-based three-dimensional graphic statics, the length of each vector represents the magnitude of a force. The forces acting at a node are in equilibrium when their vectors, placed end to end, form a closed polygon. D'Acunto and colleagues developed methods for constructing these diagrams for structures with planar or non-planar underlying graphs. Changes to either the form diagram or the force diagram can be used to update the other, although the diagrams are not generally reciprocal in the strict geometric sense. A subsequent computational implementation automates diagram construction and allows interactive transformations subject to geometric constraints. Implemented as a Grasshopper plugin for Rhinoceros, it supports the exploration of spatial trusses during conceptual design.
