= Work (physics) =

Process of energy transfer to an object via force application through displacement

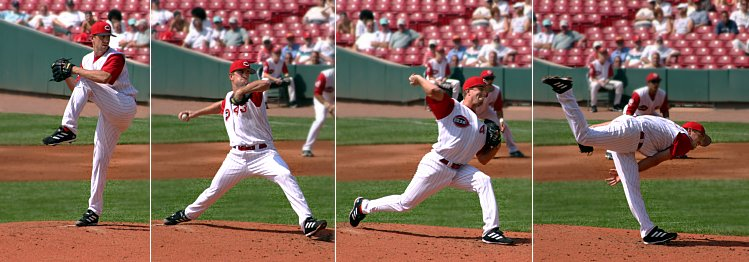
- A baseball pitcher does positive work on the ball by applying a force to it over the distance it moves while in his grip.
- Common symbols: W
- SI unit: joule (J)
- Other units: Foot-pound, Erg
- In SI base units: 1 kg⋅m^{2}⋅s^{−2}
- Derivations from other quantities: W = F ⋅ s W = τ θ
- Dimension: $\mathsf{M} \mathsf{L}^2 \mathsf{T}^{-2}$

In science, work is the energy transferred to or from an object via the application of force along a displacement. In its simplest form, for a constant force aligned with the direction of motion, the work equals the product of the force strength and the distance traveled. A force is said to do positive work if it has a component in the direction of the displacement of the point of application. A force does negative work if it has a component opposite to the direction of the displacement at the point of application of the force.

For example, when a ball is held above the ground and then dropped, the work done by the gravitational force on the ball as it falls is positive, and is equal to the weight of the ball (a force) multiplied by the distance to the ground (a displacement). If the ball is thrown upwards, the work done by the gravitational force is negative, and is equal to the weight multiplied by the displacement in the upwards direction.

Both force and displacement are vectors. The work done is given by the dot product of the two vectors, where the result is a scalar. When the force F is constant and the angle θ between the force and the displacement s is also constant, then the work done is given by:

If the force and/or displacement is variable, then work is given by the line integral:

$$\begin{aligned}
W
&= \int \mathbf{F} \cdot d\mathbf{s}\\
&=\int \mathbf{F} \cdot \frac{d\mathbf{s}}{dt} dt\\
&=\int \mathbf{F} \cdot \mathbf{v} dt
\end{aligned}$$

where $d\mathbf{s}$ is the infinitesimal change in displacement vector, $dt$ is the infinitesimal increment of time, and $\mathbf{v}$ represents the velocity vector. The first equation represents force as a function of the position and the second and third equations represent force as a function of time.

Work is a scalar quantity, so it has only magnitude and no direction. Work transfers energy from one place to another, or one form to another. The SI unit of work is the joule (J), the same unit as for energy.

== History ==
The ancient Greek understanding of physics was limited to the statics of simple machines (the balance of forces), and did not include dynamics or the concept of work. During the Renaissance the dynamics of the Mechanical Powers, as the simple machines were called, began to be studied from the standpoint of how far they could lift a load, in addition to the force they could apply, leading eventually to the new concept of mechanical work. The complete dynamic theory of simple machines was worked out by Italian scientist Galileo Galilei in 1600 in Le Meccaniche (On Mechanics), in which he showed the underlying mathematical similarity of the machines as force amplifiers. He was the first to explain that simple machines do not create energy, only transform it.

=== Early concepts of work ===
Although work was not formally used until 1826, similar concepts existed before then. Early names for the same concept included moment of activity, quantity of action, latent live force, dynamic effect, efficiency, and even force. In 1637, the French philosopher René Descartes wrote:

Lifting 100 lb one foot twice over is the same as lifting 200 lb one foot, or 100 lb two feet.

— René Descartes, Letter to Huygens

In 1686, the German philosopher Gottfried Leibniz wrote:

The same force ["work" in modern terms] is necessary to raise body A of 1 pound (libra) to a height of 4 yards (ulnae), as is necessary to raise body B of 4 pounds to a height of 1 yard.

— Gottfried Leibniz, Brevis demonstratio

In 1759, John Smeaton described a quantity that he called "power" "to signify the exertion of strength, gravitation, impulse, or pressure, as to produce motion". Smeaton continues that this quantity can be calculated if "the weight raised is multiplied by the height to which it can be raised in a given time", making this definition remarkably similar to Coriolis's.

=== Etymology and modern usage ===
The term work (or mechanical work), and the use of the work-energy principle in mechanics, was introduced in the late 1820s independently by French mathematician Gaspard-Gustave Coriolis and French Professor of Applied Mechanics Jean-Victor Poncelet. Both scientists were pursuing a view of mechanics suitable for studying the dynamics and power of machines, for example steam engines lifting buckets of water out of flooded ore mines. According to Rene Dugas, French engineer and historian, it is to Solomon of Caux "that we owe the term work in the sense that it is used in mechanics now". The concept of virtual work, and the use of variational methods in mechanics, preceded the introduction of "mechanical work" but was originally called "virtual moment". It was re-named once the terminology of Poncelet and Coriolis was adopted.

== Units ==
The SI unit of work is the joule (J), named after English physicist James Prescott Joule (1818–1889). According to the International Bureau of Weights and Measures it is defined as "the work done when the point of application of 1 MKS unit of force [newton] moves a distance of 1 metre in the direction of the force."

The dimensionally equivalent newton-metre (N⋅m) is sometimes used as the measuring unit for work, but this can be confused with the measurement unit of torque. Usage of N⋅m is discouraged by the SI authority, since it can lead to confusion as to whether the quantity expressed in newton-metres is a torque measurement, or a measurement of work.

Another unit for work is the foot-pound, which comes from the English system of measurement. As the unit name suggests, it is the product of pounds for the unit of force and feet for the unit of displacement. One joule is approximately equal to 0.7376 ft-lbs.

Non-SI units of work include the erg, the foot-pound, the foot-poundal, the kilowatt hour, the litre-atmosphere, and the horsepower-hour. Due to work having the same physical dimension as heat, occasionally measurement units typically reserved for heat or energy content, such as therm, BTU and calorie, are used as a measuring unit.

== Work and energy ==
The work W done by a constant force of magnitude F on a point that moves a displacement s in a straight line in the direction of the force is the product
$$W = \mathbf{F} \cdot \mathbf{s}$$

For example, if a force of 10 newtons (F = 10 N) acts along a point that travels 2 metres (s = 2 m), then W = Fs = (10 N) (2 m) = 20 J. This is approximately the work done lifting a 1 kg object from ground level to over a person's head against the force of gravity.

The work is doubled either by lifting twice the weight the same distance or by lifting the same weight twice the distance.

Work is closely related to energy. Energy shares the same unit of measurement with work (Joules) because the energy from the object doing work is transferred to the other objects it interacts with when work is being done. The work–energy principle states that an increase in the kinetic energy of a rigid body is caused by an equal amount of positive work done by the resultant force acting upon it. Conversely, a decrease in kinetic energy is caused by an equal amount of negative work done by the resultant force. Thus, if the net work is positive, then the particle's kinetic energy increases by the amount of the work. If the net work is negative, then the particle's kinetic energy decreases by the amount of work.

From Newton's second law, it can be shown that work on a free (no fields), rigid (no internal degrees of freedom) body, is equal to the change in kinetic energy E_{k} corresponding to the linear velocity and angular velocity of that body,
$$W = \Delta E_\text{k}.$$
The work of forces generated by a potential function is known as potential energy and the forces are said to be conservative. Therefore, work on an object that is merely displaced in a conservative force field, without change in velocity or rotation, is equal to minus the change of potential energy E_{p} of the object,
$$W = -\Delta E_\text{p}.$$
These formulas show that work is the energy associated with the action of a force, so work subsequently possesses the physical dimensions, and units, of energy. The work/energy principles discussed here are identical to electric work/energy principles.

== Constraint forces ==
Constraint forces determine the object's displacement in the system, limiting it within a range. For example, in the case of a slope plus gravity, the object is stuck to the slope and, when attached to a taut string, it cannot move in an outwards direction to make the string any 'tauter'. It eliminates all displacements in that direction, that is, the velocity in the direction of the constraint is limited to 0, so that the constraint forces do not perform work on the system.

For a mechanical system, constraint forces eliminate movement in directions that characterize the constraint. Thus the virtual work done by the forces of constraint is zero, a result which is only true if friction forces are excluded.

Fixed, frictionless constraint forces do not perform work on the system, as the angle between the motion and the constraint forces is always 90°. Examples of workless constraints are: rigid interconnections between particles, sliding motion on a frictionless surface, and rolling contact without slipping.

For example, in a pulley system like the Atwood machine, the internal forces on the rope and at the supporting pulley do no work on the system. Therefore, work need only be computed for the gravitational forces acting on the bodies. Another example is the centripetal force exerted inwards by a string on a ball in uniform circular motion sideways constrains the ball to circular motion restricting its movement away from the centre of the circle. This force does zero work because it is perpendicular to the velocity of the ball.

The magnetic force on a charged particle is F = qv × B, where q is the charge, v is the velocity of the particle, and B is the magnetic field. The result of a cross product is always perpendicular to both of the original vectors, so F ⊥ v. The dot product of two perpendicular vectors is always zero, so the work W = F ⋅ v = 0, and the magnetic force does not do work. It can change the direction of motion but never change the speed.

== Mathematical calculation ==
For moving objects, the quantity of work/time (power) is integrated along the trajectory of the point of application of the force. Thus, at any instant, the rate of the work done by a force (measured in joules/second, or watts) is the scalar product of the force (a vector), and the velocity vector of the point of application. This scalar product of force and velocity is known as instantaneous power. Just as velocities may be integrated over time to obtain a total distance, by the fundamental theorem of calculus, the total work along a path is similarly the time-integral of instantaneous power applied along the trajectory of the point of application.

Work is the result of a force on a point that follows a curve X, with a velocity v, at each instant. The small amount of work δW that occurs over an instant of time dt is calculated as
$$\delta W = \mathbf{F} \cdot d\mathbf{s} = \mathbf{F} \cdot \mathbf{v}dt$$
where the F ⋅ v is the power over the instant dt. The sum of these small amounts of work over the trajectory of the point yields the work,
$$W = \int_{t_1}^{t_2}\mathbf{F} \cdot \mathbf{v} \, dt = \int_{t_1}^{t_2}\mathbf{F} \cdot \tfrac{d\mathbf{s}}{dt} \, dt =\int_C \mathbf{F} \cdot d\mathbf{s},$$
where C is the trajectory from x(t_{1}) to x(t_{2}). This integral is computed along the trajectory of the particle, and is therefore said to be path dependent.

If the force is always directed along this line, and the magnitude of the force is F, then this integral simplifies to
$$W = \int_C F\,ds$$
where s is displacement along the line. If F is constant, in addition to being directed along the line, then the integral simplifies further to
$$W = \int_C F\,ds = F\int_C ds = Fs$$
where s is the displacement of the point along the line.

This calculation can be generalized for a constant force that is not directed along the line, followed by the particle. In this case the dot product F ⋅ ds = F cos θ ds, where θ is the angle between the force vector and the direction of movement, that is
$$W = \int_C \mathbf{F} \cdot d\mathbf{s} = Fs\cos\theta.$$

When a force component is perpendicular to the displacement of the object (such as when a body moves in a circular path under a central force), no work is done, since the cosine of 90° is zero. Thus, no work can be performed by gravity on a planet with a circular orbit (this is ideal, as all orbits are slightly elliptical). Also, no work is done on a body moving circularly at a constant speed while constrained by mechanical force, such as moving at constant speed in a frictionless ideal centrifuge.

=== Work done by a variable force ===
Calculating the work as "force times straight path segment" would only apply in the most simple of circumstances, as noted above. If force is changing, or if the body is moving along a curved path, possibly rotating and not necessarily rigid, then only the path of the application point of the force is relevant for the work done, and only the component of the force parallel to the application point velocity is doing work (positive work when in the same direction, and negative when in the opposite direction of the velocity). This component of force can be described by the scalar quantity called scalar tangential component (F cos(θ), where θ is the angle between the force and the velocity). And then the most general definition of work can be formulated as follows:

The area under the curve gives the work done by F(x).

Work done by a variable force is the line integral of its scalar tangential component along the path of its application point.

If the force varies (e.g. compressing a spring) we need to use calculus to find the work done. If the force as a variable of x is given by F(x), then the work done by the force along the x-axis from x_{1} to x_{2} is:

$$W = \lim_{\Delta\mathbf{x} \to 0}\sum_{x_1}^{x_2}\mathbf{F(x)}\Delta\mathbf{x} = \int_{x_1}^{x_2}\mathbf{F(x)}d\mathbf{x}.$$

Thus, the work done for a variable force can be expressed as a definite integral of force over displacement.

If the displacement as a variable of time is given by ∆x(t), then work done by the variable force from t_{1} to t_{2} is:

$$W = \int_{t_1}^{t_2}\mathbf{F}(t)\cdot \mathbf{v}(t)dt = \int_{t_1}^{t_2}P(t)dt.$$

Thus, the work done for a variable force can be expressed as a definite integral of power over time.

=== Torque and rotation ===
A force couple results from equal and opposite forces, acting on two different points of a rigid body. The sum (resultant) of these forces may cancel, but their effect on the body is the couple or torque T. The work of the torque is calculated as
$$\delta W = \mathbf{T} \cdot \boldsymbol{\omega} \, dt,$$
where the T ⋅ ω is the power over the instant dt. The sum of these small amounts of work over the trajectory of the rigid body yields the work,
$$W = \int_{t_1}^{t_2} \mathbf{T} \cdot \boldsymbol{\omega} \, dt.$$
This integral is computed along the trajectory of the rigid body with an angular velocity ω that varies with time, and is therefore said to be path dependent.

If the angular velocity vector maintains a constant direction, then it takes the form,
$$\boldsymbol{\omega} = \dot{\phi}\mathbf{S},$$
where $\phi$ is the angle of rotation about the constant unit vector S. In this case, the work of the torque becomes,
$$W = \int_{t_1}^{t_2} \mathbf{T} \cdot \boldsymbol{\omega} \, dt = \int_{t_1}^{t_2} \mathbf{T} \cdot \mathbf{S} \frac{d\phi}{dt} dt = \int_C\mathbf{T}\cdot \mathbf{S} \, d\phi,$$
where C is the trajectory from $\phi (t_{1})$ to $\phi (t_{2})$. This integral depends on the rotational trajectory $\phi (t)$, and is therefore path-dependent.

If the torque $\tau$ is aligned with the angular velocity vector so that, and both the torque and angular velocity are constant, then the work takes the form,
$$W = \int_{t_1}^{t_2} \tau \dot{\phi} \, dt = \tau(\phi_2 - \phi_1).$$

A force of constant magnitude and perpendicular to the lever arm

This result can be understood more simply by considering the torque as arising from a force of constant magnitude F, being applied perpendicularly to a lever arm at a distance $r$, as shown in the figure. This force will act through the distance along the circular arc $l=s=r\phi$, so the work done is
$$W = F s = F r \phi .$$
Introduce the torque τ = Fr, to obtain
$$W = F r \phi = \tau \phi ,$$
as presented above.

Notice that only the component of torque in the direction of the angular velocity vector contributes to the work.

== Work and potential energy ==
The scalar product of a force F and the velocity v of its point of application defines the power input to a system at an instant of time. Integration of this power over the trajectory of the point of application, C = x(t), defines the work input to the system by the force.

=== Path dependence ===
Therefore, the work done by a force F on an object that travels along a curve C is given by the line integral:
$$W = \int_C \mathbf{F} \cdot d\mathbf{x} = \int_{t_1}^{t_2}\mathbf{F}\cdot \mathbf{v}dt,$$
where dx(t) defines the trajectory C and v is the velocity along this trajectory. In general this integral requires that the path along which the velocity is defined, so the evaluation of work is said to be path dependent.

The time derivative of the integral for work yields the instantaneous power,
$$\frac{dW}{dt} = P(t) = \mathbf{F}\cdot \mathbf{v} .$$

=== Path independence ===
If the work for an applied force is independent of the path, then the work done by the force, by the gradient theorem, defines a potential function which is evaluated at the start and end of the trajectory of the point of application. This means that there is a potential function U(x), that can be evaluated at the two points x(t_{1}) and x(t_{2}) to obtain the work over any trajectory between these two points. It is tradition to define this function with a negative sign so that positive work is a reduction in the potential, that is
$$W = \int_C \mathbf{F} \cdot d\mathbf{x} = \int_{\mathbf{x}(t_1)}^{\mathbf{x}(t_2)} \mathbf{F} \cdot d\mathbf{x} = U(\mathbf{x}(t_1))-U(\mathbf{x}(t_2)).$$

The function U(x) is called the potential energy associated with the applied force. The force derived from such a potential function is said to be conservative. Examples of forces that have potential energies are gravity and spring forces.

In this case, the gradient of work yields and the force F is said to be "derivable from a potential."

Because the potential U defines a force F at every point x in space, the set of forces is called a force field. The power applied to a body by a force field is obtained from the gradient of the work, or potential, in the direction of the velocity V of the body, that is

=== Work by gravity ===
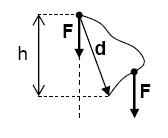
Gravity F = mg does work W = mgh along any descending path

In the absence of other forces, gravity results in a constant downward acceleration of every freely moving object. Near Earth's surface the acceleration due to gravity is g = 9.8 m⋅s^{−2} and the gravitational force on an object of mass m is F_{g} = mg. It is convenient to imagine this gravitational force concentrated at the center of mass of the object.

If an object with weight mg is displaced upwards or downwards a vertical distance y_{2} − y_{1}, the work W done on the object is:

$$W = F_g (y_2 - y_1) = F_g\Delta y = mg\Delta y$$

where F_{g} is weight (pound-force in imperial units, and newtons in SI units), and Δy is the change in height y. Notice that the work done by gravity depends only on the vertical movement of the object. The presence of friction does not affect the work done on the object by its weight.

==== Gravity in 3D space ====
The force of gravity exerted by a mass M on another mass m is given by
$$\mathbf{F} = -\frac{GMm}{r^2} \hat\mathbf{r} = -\frac{GMm}{r^3}\mathbf{r},$$

where r is the position vector from M to m and r̂ is the unit vector in the direction of r.

Let the mass m move at the velocity v; then the work of gravity on this mass as it moves from position r(t_{1}) to r(t_{2}) is given by
$$W = -\int^{\mathbf{r}(t_2)}_{\mathbf{r}(t_1)} \frac{GMm}{r^3} \mathbf{r} \cdot d\mathbf{r} = -\int^{t_2}_{t_1} \frac{GMm}{r^3}\mathbf{r} \cdot \mathbf{v} \, dt.$$

Notice that the position and velocity of the mass m are given by
$$\mathbf{r} = r\mathbf{e}_r, \qquad\mathbf{v} = \frac{d\mathbf{r}}{dt} = \dot{r}\mathbf{e}_r + r\dot{\theta}\mathbf{e}_t,$$

where e_{r} and e_{t} are the radial and tangential unit vectors directed relative to the vector from M to m, and we use the fact that $d \mathbf{e}_r / dt = \dot{\theta}\mathbf{e}_t.$ Use this to simplify the formula for work of gravity to
$$W = -\int^{t_2}_{t_1}\frac{GmM}{r^3}(r\mathbf{e}_r) \cdot \left(\dot{r}\mathbf{e}_r + r\dot{\theta}\mathbf{e}_t\right) dt = -\int^{t_2}_{t_1}\frac{GmM}{r^3}r\dot{r}dt = \frac{GMm}{r(t_2)}-\frac{GMm}{r(t_1)}.$$

This calculation uses the fact that
$$\frac{d}{dt}r^{-1} = -r^{-2}\dot{r} = -\frac{\dot{r}}{r^2}.$$

The function

$$U = -\frac{GMm}{r}$$

is the gravitational potential function, also known as gravitational potential energy. The negative sign follows the convention that work is gained from a loss of potential energy.

=== Work by a spring ===
Forces in springs assembled in parallel

Consider a spring that exerts a horizontal force F = (−kx, 0, 0) that is proportional to its deflection in the x direction independent of how a body moves. The work of this spring on a body moving along the space with the curve X(t) = (x(t), y(t), z(t)), is calculated using its velocity, v = (v_{x}, v_{y}, v_{z}), to obtain
$$W=\int_0^t\mathbf{F}\cdot\mathbf{v}dt =-\int_0^tkx v_x dt = -\frac{1}{2}kx^2.$$
For convenience, consider contact with the spring occurs at t = 0, then the integral of the product of the distance x and the x-velocity, xv_{x}dt, over time t is 1/2x^{2}. The work is the product of the distance times the spring force, which is also dependent on distance; hence the x^{2} result.

=== Work by a gas ===
The work $W$ done by a body of gas on its surroundings is:

$$W = \int_a^b P \, dV$$

where P is pressure, V is volume, and a and b are initial and final volumes.

== Work–energy principle ==
The principle of work and kinetic energy (also known as the work–energy principle) states that the work done by all forces acting on a particle (the work of the resultant force) equals the change in the kinetic energy of the particle. That is, the work W done by the resultant force on a particle equals the change in the particle's kinetic energy $E_\text{k}$,

$$W = \Delta E_\text{k} = \frac{1}{2}mv_2^2 - \frac{1}{2}mv_1^2$$

where $v_1$ and $v_2$ are the speeds of the particle before and after the work is done, and m is its mass.

The derivation of the work–energy principle begins with Newton's second law of motion and the resultant force on a particle. Computation of the scalar product of the force with the velocity of the particle evaluates the instantaneous power added to the system. (Constraints define the direction of movement of the particle by ensuring there is no component of velocity in the direction of the constraint force. This also means the constraint forces do not add to the instantaneous power.) The time integral of this scalar equation yields work from the instantaneous power, and kinetic energy from the scalar product of acceleration with velocity. The fact that the work–energy principle eliminates the constraint forces underlies Lagrangian mechanics.

This section focuses on the work–energy principle as it applies to particle dynamics. In more general systems work can change the potential energy of a mechanical device, the thermal energy in a thermal system, or the electrical energy in an electrical device. Work transfers energy from one place to another or one form to another.

=== Derivation for a particle moving along a straight line ===
In the case the resultant force F is constant in both magnitude and direction, and parallel to the velocity of the particle, the particle is moving with constant acceleration a along a straight line. The relation between the net force and the acceleration is given by the equation F = ma (Newton's second law), and the particle displacement s can be expressed by the equation

$$s = \frac{v_2^2 - v_1^2}{2a}$$

which follows from $v_2^2 = v_1^2 + 2as$ (see Equations of motion).

The work of the net force is calculated as the product of its magnitude and the particle displacement. Substituting the above equations, one obtains:

$$W = Fs = mas = ma\frac{v_2^2-v_1^2}{2a} = \frac{1}{2} mv_2^2- \frac{1}{2} mv_1^2 = \Delta E_\text{k}$$

Other derivation: by
$$W = Fs = mas = m\frac{v_2^2 - v_1^2}{2s}s = \frac{1}{2}mv_2^2-\frac{1}{2}mv_1^2 = \Delta E_\text{k}$$

In the general case of rectilinear motion, when the net force F is not constant in magnitude, but is constant in direction, and parallel to the velocity of the particle, the work must be integrated along the path of the particle:

$$W = \int_{t_1}^{t_2} \mathbf{F}\cdot \mathbf{v}dt = \int_{t_1}^{t_2} F \,v \, dt = \int_{t_1}^{t_2} ma \,v \, dt = m \int_{t_1}^{t_2} v \,\frac{dv}{dt}\,dt = m \int_{v_1}^{v_2} v\,dv = \tfrac12 m \left(v_2^2 - v_1^2\right) .$$

=== General derivation of the work–energy principle for a particle ===
For any net force acting on a particle moving along any curvilinear path, it can be demonstrated that its work equals the change in the kinetic energy of the particle by a simple derivation analogous to the equation above. It is known as the work–energy principle:

$$W = \int_{t_1}^{t_2} \mathbf{F}\cdot \mathbf{v}dt = m \int_{t_1}^{t_2} \mathbf{a} \cdot \mathbf{v}dt = \frac{m}{2} \int_{t_1}^{t_2} \frac{d v^2}{dt}\,dt = \frac{m}{2} \int_{v^2_1}^{v^2_2} d v^2 = \frac{mv_2^2}{2} - \frac{mv_1^2}{2} = \Delta E_\text{k}$$

The identity $\mathbf{a} \cdot \mathbf{v} = \frac{1}{2} \frac{d v^2}{dt}$ requires some algebra. From the identity $v^2 = \mathbf{v} \cdot \mathbf{v}$ and definition $\mathbf{a} = \frac{d \mathbf{v}}{dt}$ it follows

$$\frac{d v^2}{dt} = \frac{d (\mathbf{v} \cdot \mathbf{v})}{dt} = \frac{d \mathbf{v}}{dt} \cdot \mathbf{v} + \mathbf{v} \cdot \frac{d \mathbf{v}}{dt} = 2 \frac{d \mathbf{v}}{dt} \cdot \mathbf{v} = 2 \mathbf{a} \cdot \mathbf{v} .$$

The remaining part of the above derivation is just simple calculus, same as in the preceding rectilinear case.

=== Derivation for a particle in constrained movement ===
In particle dynamics, a formula equating work applied to a system to its change in kinetic energy is obtained as a first integral of Newton's second law of motion. It is useful to notice that the resultant force used in Newton's laws can be separated into forces that are applied to the particle and forces imposed by constraints on the movement of the particle. Remarkably, the work of a constraint force is zero, therefore only the work of the applied forces need be considered in the work–energy principle.

To see this, consider a particle P that follows the trajectory X(t) with a force F acting on it. Isolate the particle from its environment to expose constraint forces R, then Newton's Law takes the form

$$\mathbf{F} + \mathbf{R} = m \ddot{\mathbf{X}},$$

where m is the mass of the particle.

==== Vector formulation ====
Note that n dots above a vector indicates its nth time derivative. The scalar product of each side of Newton's law with the velocity vector yields

$$\mathbf{F}\cdot\dot{\mathbf{X}} = m\ddot{\mathbf{X}}\cdot\dot{\mathbf{X}},$$

because the constraint forces are perpendicular to the particle velocity. Integrate this equation along its trajectory from the point X(t_{1}) to the point X(t_{2}) to obtain

$$\int_{t_1}^{t_2} \mathbf{F} \cdot \dot{\mathbf{X}} dt = m \int_{t_1}^{t_2} \ddot{\mathbf{X}} \cdot \dot{\mathbf{X}} dt.$$

The left side of this equation is the work of the applied force as it acts on the particle along the trajectory from time t_{1} to time t_{2}. This can also be written as

$$W = \int_{t_1}^{t_2} \mathbf{F}\cdot\dot{\mathbf{X}} dt = \int_{\mathbf{X}(t_1)}^{\mathbf{X}(t_2)} \mathbf{F}\cdot d\mathbf{X}.$$

This integral is computed along the trajectory X(t) of the particle and is therefore path dependent.

The right side of the first integral of Newton's equations can be simplified using the following identity

$$\frac{1}{2}\frac{d}{dt}(\dot{\mathbf{X}}\cdot \dot{\mathbf{X}}) = \ddot{\mathbf{X}}\cdot\dot{\mathbf{X}},$$

(see product rule for derivation). Now it is integrated explicitly to obtain the change in kinetic energy,

$$\Delta K = m\int_{t_1}^{t_2}\ddot{\mathbf{X}}\cdot\dot{\mathbf{X}}dt = \frac{m}{2}\int_{t_1}^{t_2}\frac{d}{dt} (\dot{\mathbf{X}} \cdot \dot{\mathbf{X}}) dt = \frac{m}{2} \dot{\mathbf{X}}\cdot \dot{\mathbf{X}}(t_2) - \frac{m}{2} \dot{\mathbf{X}}\cdot \dot{\mathbf{X}} (t_1) = \frac{1}{2}m \Delta \mathbf{v}^2 ,$$

where the kinetic energy of the particle is defined by the scalar quantity,

$$K = \frac{m}{2} \dot{\mathbf{X}} \cdot \dot{\mathbf{X}} =\frac{1}{2} m {\mathbf{v}^2}$$

==== Tangential and normal components ====
It is useful to resolve the velocity and acceleration vectors into tangential and normal components along the trajectory X(t), such that

$$\dot{\mathbf{X}}=v \mathbf{T}\quad\text{and}\quad \ddot{\mathbf{X}}=\dot{v}\mathbf{T} + v^2\kappa \mathbf{N},$$

where

$$v=|\dot{\mathbf{X}}|=\sqrt{\dot{\mathbf{X}}\cdot\dot{\mathbf{X}}}.$$

Then, the scalar product of velocity with acceleration in Newton's second law takes the form

$$\Delta K = m\int_{t_1}^{t_2}\dot{v}v \, dt = \frac{m}{2} \int_{t_1}^{t_2} \frac{d}{dt}v^2 \, dt = \frac{m}{2} v^2(t_2) - \frac{m}{2} v^2(t_1),$$

where the kinetic energy of the particle is defined by the scalar quantity,

$$K = \frac{m}{2} v^2 = \frac{m}{2} \dot{\mathbf{X}} \cdot \dot{\mathbf{X}}.$$

The result is the work–energy principle for particle dynamics,

$$W = \Delta K.$$

This derivation can be generalized to arbitrary rigid body systems.

=== Moving in a straight line (skid to a stop) ===
Consider the case of a vehicle moving along a straight horizontal trajectory under the action of a driving force and gravity that sum to F. The constraint forces between the vehicle and the road define R, and we have

$$\mathbf{F} + \mathbf{R} = m\ddot{\mathbf{X}}.$$

For convenience let the trajectory be along the X-axis, so X = (d, 0) and the velocity is V = (v, 0), then R ⋅ V = 0, and F ⋅ V = F_{x}v, where F_{x} is the component of F along the X-axis, so

$$F_x v = m\dot{v}v.$$

Integration of both sides yields
$$\int_{t_1}^{t_2}F_x v dt = \frac{m}{2} v^2(t_2) - \frac{m}{2} v^2(t_1).$$
If F_{x} is constant along the trajectory, then the integral of velocity is distance, so

$$F_x (d(t_2)-d(t_1)) = \frac{m}{2} v^2(t_2) - \frac{m}{2} v^2(t_1).$$

As an example consider a car skidding to a stop, where k is the coefficient of friction and w is the weight of the car. Then the force along the trajectory is F_{x} = −kw. The velocity v of the car can be determined from the length s of the skid using the work–energy principle,

$$kws = \frac{w}{2g} v^2,\quad\text{or}\quad v = \sqrt{2ksg}.$$

This formula uses the fact that the mass of the vehicle is m = w/g.

=== Coasting down an inclined surface (gravity racing) ===
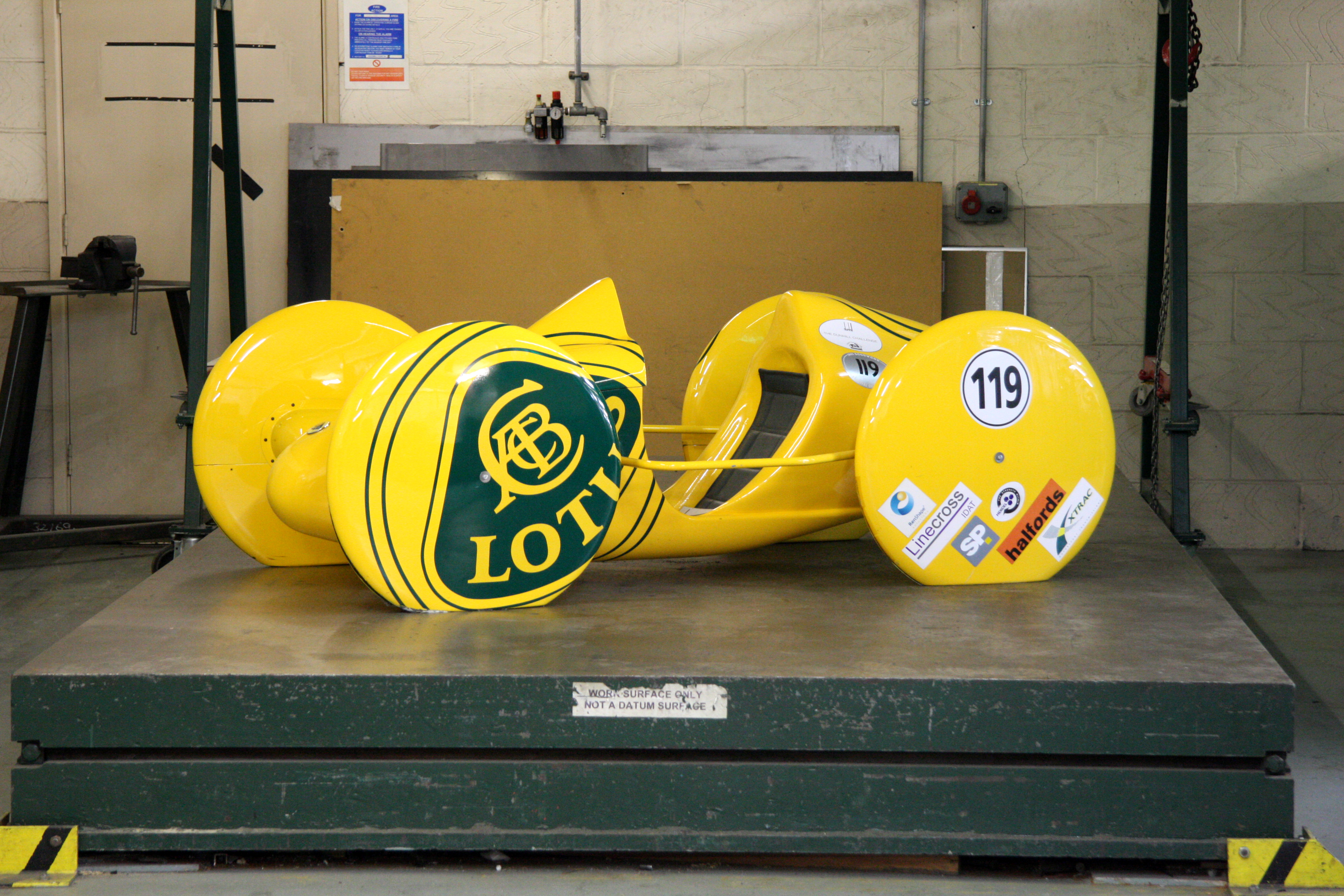
Lotus type 119B gravity racer at Lotus 60th celebration

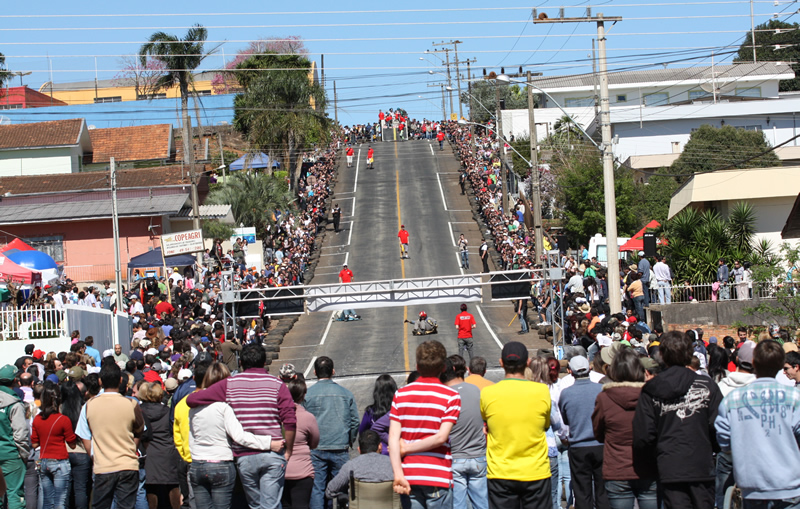
Gravity racing championship in Campos Novos, Santa Catarina, Brazil, 8 September 2010

Consider the case of a vehicle that starts at rest and coasts down an inclined surface (such as mountain road), the work–energy principle helps compute the minimum distance that the vehicle travels to reach a velocity V, of say 60 mph (27 m/s). Rolling resistance and air drag will slow the vehicle down so the actual distance will be greater than if these forces are neglected.

Let the trajectory of the vehicle following the road be X(t) which is a curve in three-dimensional space. The force acting on the vehicle that pushes it down the road is the constant force of gravity F = (0, 0, w), while the force of the road on the vehicle is the constraint force R. Newton's second law yields

$$\mathbf{F} + \mathbf{R} = m \ddot{\mathbf{X}}.$$

The scalar product of this equation with the velocity, V = (v_{x}, v_{y}, v_{z}), yields

$$w v_z = m\dot{V}V,$$

where V is the magnitude of V. The constraint forces between the vehicle and the road cancel from this equation because R ⋅ V = 0, which means they do no work. Integrate both sides to obtain

$$\int_{t_1}^{t_2} w v_z dt = \frac{m}{2} V^2(t_2) - \frac{m}{2} V^2 (t_1).$$

The weight force w is constant along the trajectory and the integral of the vertical velocity is the vertical distance; therefore,

$$w \Delta z = \frac{m}{2}V^2.$$

Recall that V(t_{1}) = 0. Notice that this result does not depend on the shape of the road followed by the vehicle.

In order to determine the distance along the road assume the downgrade is 6%, which is a steep road. This means the altitude decreases 6 feet for every 100 feet traveled—for angles this small the sin and tan functions are approximately equal. Therefore, the distance s in feet down a 6% grade to reach the velocity V is at least

$$s = \frac{\Delta z}{0.06}= 8.3\frac{V^2}{g},\quad\text{or}\quad s=8.3\frac{88^2}{32.2}\approx 2000\mathrm{ft}.$$

This formula uses the fact that the weight of the vehicle is w = mg.

== Work of forces acting on a rigid body ==
The work of forces acting at various points on a single rigid body can be calculated from the work of a resultant force and torque. To see this, let the forces F_{1}, F_{2}, ..., F_{n} act on the points X_{1}, X_{2}, ..., X_{n} in a rigid body.

The trajectories of X_{i}, i = 1, ..., n are defined by the movement of the rigid body. This movement is given by the set of rotations [A(t)] and the trajectory d(t) of a reference point in the body. Let the coordinates x_{i} i = 1, ..., n define these points in the moving rigid body's reference frame M, so that the trajectories traced in the fixed frame F are given by

$$\mathbf{X}_i(t)= [A(t)]\mathbf{x}_i + \mathbf{d}(t)\quad i=1,\ldots, n.$$

The velocity of the points X_{i} along their trajectories are

$$\mathbf{V}_i = \boldsymbol{\omega}\times(\mathbf{X}_i-\mathbf{d}) + \dot{\mathbf{d}},$$

where ω is the angular velocity vector obtained from the skew symmetric matrix

$$[\Omega] = \dot{A}A^\mathsf{T},$$

known as the angular velocity matrix.

The small amount of work by the forces over the small displacements δr_{i} can be determined by approximating the displacement by δr = vδt so

$$\delta W = \mathbf{F}_1\cdot\mathbf{V}_1\delta t+\mathbf{F}_2\cdot\mathbf{V}_2\delta t + \ldots + \mathbf{F}_n\cdot\mathbf{V}_n\delta t$$

or

$$\delta W = \sum_{i=1}^n \mathbf{F}_i\cdot (\boldsymbol{\omega}\times(\mathbf{X}_i-\mathbf{d}) + \dot{\mathbf{d}})\delta t.$$

This formula can be rewritten to obtain

$$\delta W = \left(\sum_{i=1}^n \mathbf{F}_i\right)\cdot\dot{\mathbf{d}}\delta t + \left(\sum_{i=1}^n \left(\mathbf{X}_i-\mathbf{d}\right)\times\mathbf{F}_i\right) \cdot \boldsymbol{\omega}\delta t = \left(\mathbf{F}\cdot\dot{\mathbf{d}}+ \mathbf{T} \cdot \boldsymbol{\omega}\right)\delta t,$$

where F and T are the resultant force and torque applied at the reference point d of the moving frame M in the rigid body.

== Bibliography ==
- Serway, Raymond A.; Jewett, John W. (2004). Physics for Scientists and Engineers (6th ed.). Brooks/Cole. ISBN 0-534-40842-7.
- Tipler, Paul (1991). Physics for Scientists and Engineers: Mechanics (3rd ed., extended version ed.). W. H. Freeman. ISBN 0-87901-432-6.

Linear/translational quantities				Angular/rotational quantities			
Dimensions	1	L	L^{2}	Dimensions	1	θ	θ^{2}
T	time: t s	absement: A m s		T	time: t s		
1		distance: d, position: r, s, x, displacement: d m	area: A m^{2}	1		angle: θ, angular displacement: θ rad	solid angle: Ω rad^{2}, sr
T^{−1}	frequency: f s^{−1}, Hz	speed: v, velocity: v m s^{−1}	kinematic viscosity: ν, specific angular momentum: h m^{2} s^{−1}	T^{−1}	frequency: f, rotational speed: n, rotational velocity: n s^{−1}, Hz	angular speed: ω, angular velocity: ω rad s^{−1}	
T^{−2}		acceleration: a m s^{−2}		T^{−2}	rotational acceleration s^{−2}	angular acceleration: α rad s^{−2}	
T^{−3}		jerk: j m s^{−3}		T^{−3}		angular jerk: ζ rad s^{−3}	
M	mass: m kg	weighted position: M ⟨x⟩ = ∑ m x	moment of inertia: I kg m^{2}	ML			
MT^{−1}	Mass flow rate: $\dot{m}$ kg s^{−1}	momentum: p, impulse: J kg m s^{−1}, N s	action: 𝒮, actergy: ℵ kg m^{2} s^{−1}, J s	MLT^{−1}		angular momentum: L, angular impulse: ΔL kg m rad s^{−1}	
MT^{−2}		force: F, weight: F_{g} kg m s^{−2}, N	energy: E, work: W, Lagrangian: L kg m^{2} s^{−2}, J	MLT^{−2}		torque: τ, moment: M kg m rad s^{−2}, N m	
MT^{−3}		yank: Y kg m s^{−3}, N s^{−1}	power: P kg m^{2} s^{−3}, W	MLT^{−3}		rotatum: P kg m rad s^{−3}, N m s^{−1}	
