= Funicular curve =

Compression-only shape mirroring a hanging chain

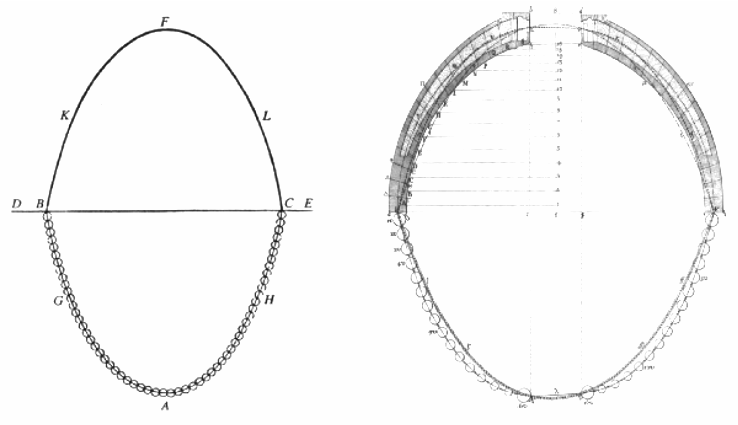
Analogies between the hanging chains and standing structures: an arch and the dome of Saint Peter's Basilica in Rome (Giovanni Poleni, 1748)

In architecture, the funicular curve (also funicular polygon, funicular shape, from the Latin: fūniculus, "of rope") is an approach used to design the compression-only architectural forms (like masonry arches) using an equivalence between the rope with hanging weights and standing arch with its load. This duality was noticed by Robert Hooke in 1675 ("as hangs the flexible line, so, but inverted, will stand the rigid arch"). If the hanging rope carries just its own weight (in this case it is usually called a "chain" and is equivalent to a free-standing arch with no external load), the resulting curve is a catenary.

In graphic statics, a funicular polygon is a graphic method of finding out the line of action for a combination of forces applied to a solid body at different points, a complement to the force polygon used to obtain the value and direction of the resultant force. Both polygons were introduced by Pierre Varignon (Nouvelle Mecanique ou Statique, 1725) and became the basis of the graphic statics in the second half of the 19th century.

== Hanging chain model ==
Multiple ropes with weights can be connected together forming a hanging chain model of a complete structure. The uses of this "outlandish", complicated in comparison with even pre-computer techniques, like graphic statics, method were rare, yet interesting. Usually the technique was used for planar structures as well as the ones with rotational symmetry, like domes. The method can also be applied to arbitrary three-dimensional structures, as first shown by Gaudi while designing the church of Colònia Güell. Gaudi had built a 1:10 scale hanging chain model of the church that did not survive. He also used a smaller copy that was at the time stored in the Sagrada Família basilica. This small model, on exhibit at the museum of the basilica, is often misinterpreted as a model of the basilica itself.

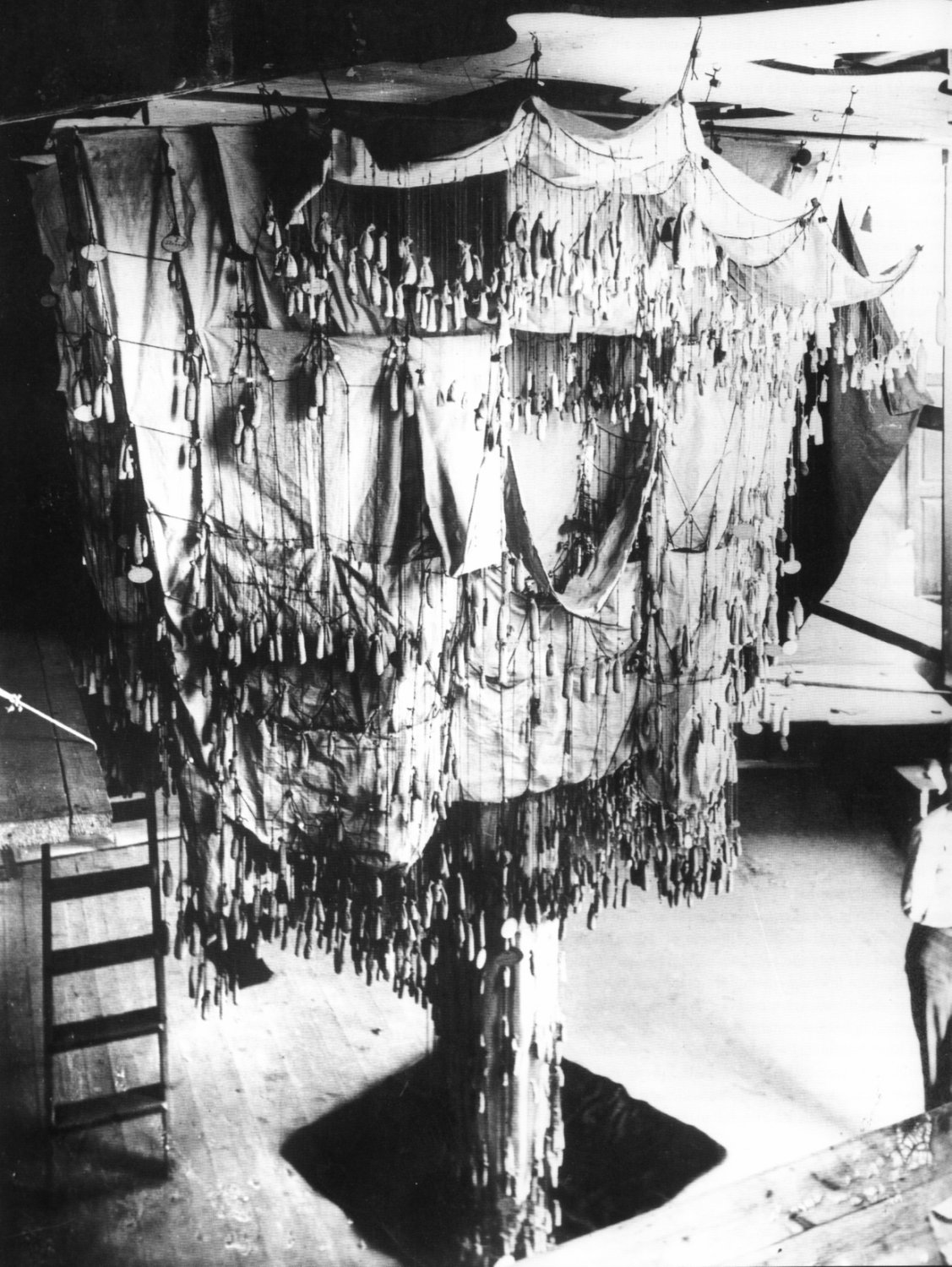
Original 1:10 scale hanging model of the church of Colònia Güell uses cloth cutouts to show the (inverted) appearance of the church

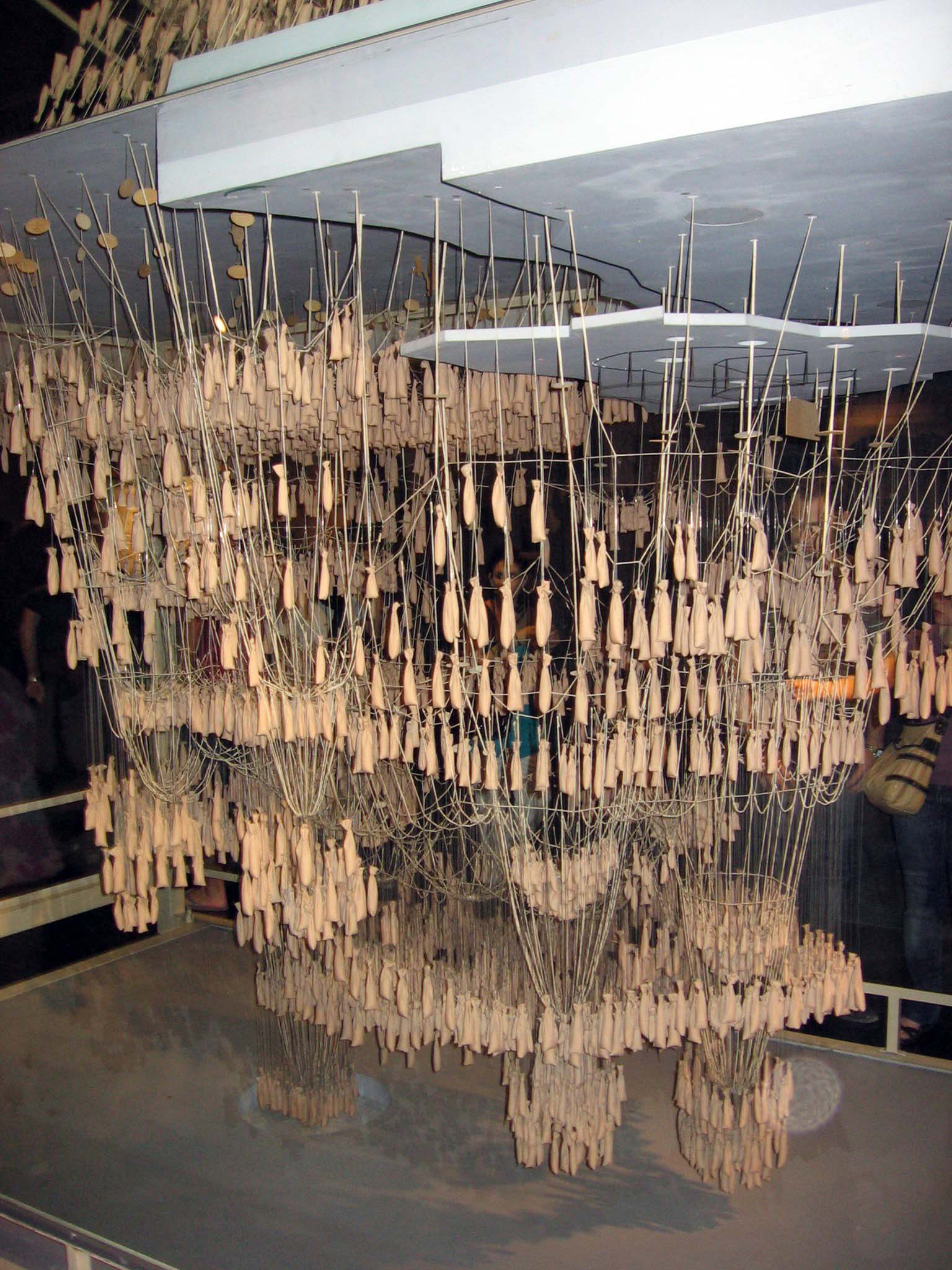
Smaller model on the display at the museum

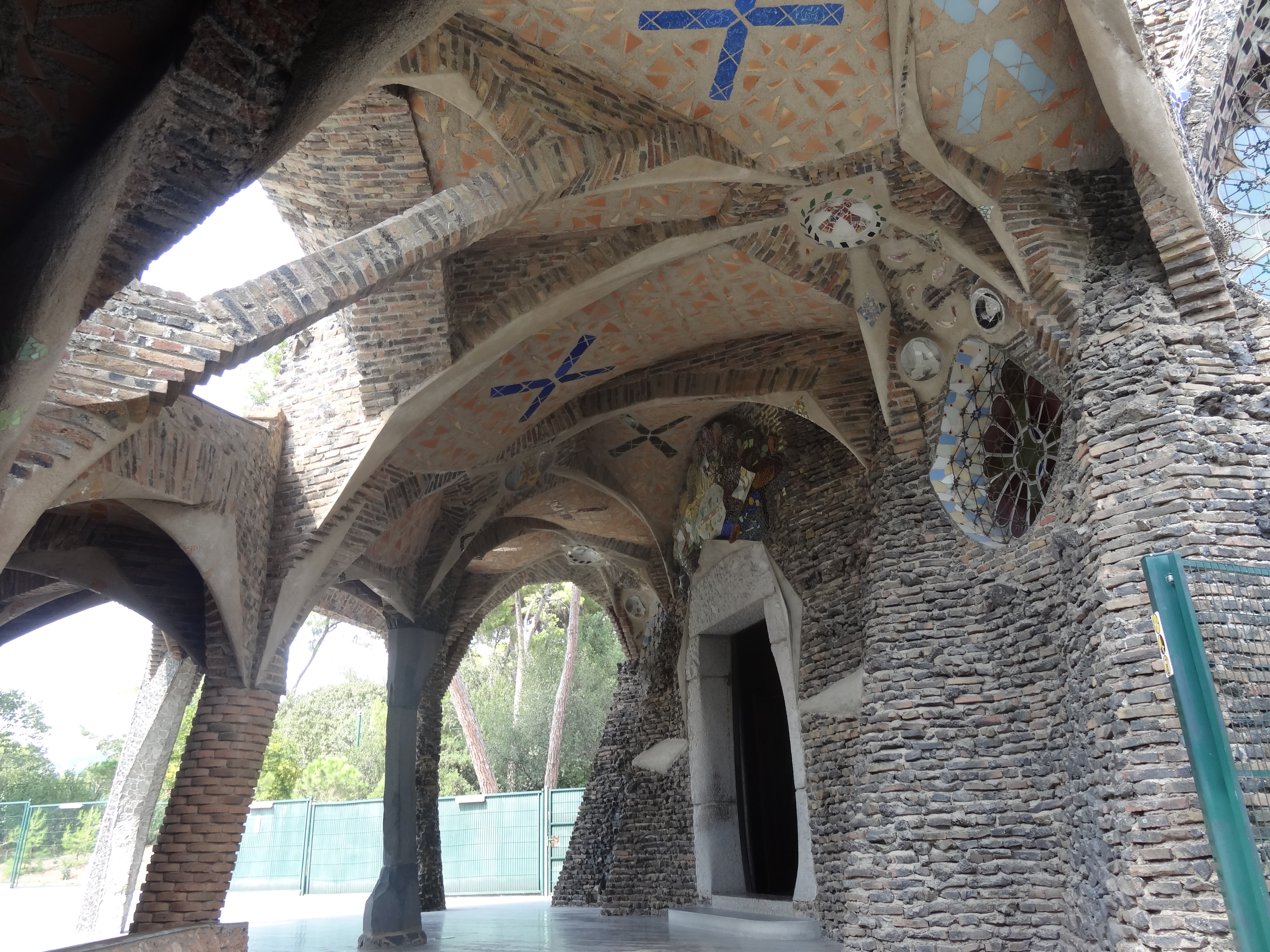
Complex system of supports at the entrance of the church at Colònia Güell

== See also ==
- Mathematics and architecture

== Sources ==
- Woodman, Francis; Heyman, Jacques (2003). "Masonry". Oxford Art Online. Oxford University Press. doi:10.1093/gao/9781884446054.article.t054954. ISBN 978-1-884446-05-4.
- The Concise Oxford Dictionary of English Etymology. Oxford University Press. 1996-01-01. doi:10.1093/acref/9780192830982.001.0001. ISBN 978-0-19-283098-2.
- Escudier, Marcel; Atkins, Tony (2019). A Dictionary of Mechanical Engineering. Oxford University Press. doi:10.1093/acref/9780198832102.001.0001. ISBN 978-0-19-883210-2.
- Tomlow, Jos (2011). "Gaudí's reluctant attitude towards the inverted catenary". Proceedings of the Institution of Civil Engineers - Engineering History and Heritage. 164 (4): 219–233. doi:10.1680/ehah.2011.164.4.219. ISSN 1757-9430.
- Markou, Athanasios A.; Ruan, Gengmu (2022). "Graphic statics: projective funicular polygon". Structures. 41: 1390–1396. doi:10.1016/j.istruc.2022.05.049.
