= Centers of gravity in non-uniform fields =

Center of gravity of a material body

In physics, a center of gravity of a material body is a point that may be used for a summary description of gravitational interactions. In a uniform gravitational field, the center of mass serves as the center of gravity. This is a very good approximation for smaller bodies near the surface of Earth, so there is no practical need to distinguish "center of gravity" from "center of mass" in most applications, such as engineering and medicine.

In a non-uniform field, gravitational effects such as potential energy, force, and torque can no longer be calculated using the center of mass alone. In particular, a non-uniform gravitational field can produce a torque on an object, even about an axis through the center of mass. The center of gravity seeks to explain this effect. Formally, a center of gravity is an application point of the resultant gravitational force on the body. Such a point may not exist, and if it exists, it is not unique. One can further define a unique center of gravity by approximating the field as either parallel or spherically symmetric.

The concept of a center of gravity as distinct from the center of mass is rarely used in applications, even in celestial mechanics, where non-uniform fields are important. Since the center of gravity depends on the external field, its motion is harder to determine than the motion of the center of mass. The common method to deal with gravitational torques is a field theory.

== Center of mass ==
One way to define the center of gravity of a body is as the unique point in the body if it exists, that satisfies the following requirement: There is no torque about the point for any positioning of the body in the field of force in which it is placed. This center of gravity exists only when the force is uniform, in which case it coincides with the center of mass. This approach dates back to Archimedes.

== Centers of gravity in a field ==
When a body is affected by a non-uniform external gravitational field, one can sometimes define a center of gravity relative to that field that will act as a point where the gravitational force is applied. Textbooks such as The Feynman Lectures on Physics characterize the center of gravity as a point about which there is no torque. In other words, the center of gravity is a point of application for the resultant force. Under this formulation, the center of gravity r_{cg} is defined as a point that satisfies the equation

$$\mathbf{r}_\mathrm{cg} \times \mathbf{F} = \boldsymbol{\tau},$$

where F and τ are the total force and torque on the body due to gravity.

One complication concerning r_{cg} is that its defining equation is not generally solvable. If F and τ are not orthogonal, then there is no solution; the force of gravity does not have a resultant and cannot be replaced by a single force at any point. There are some important special cases where F and τ are guaranteed to be orthogonal, such as if all forces lie in a single plane or are aligned with a single point.

If the equation is solvable, there is another complication: its solutions are not unique. Instead, there are infinitely many solutions; the set of all solutions is known as the line of action of the force. This line is parallel to the weight F. In general, there is no way to choose a particular point as the unique center of gravity. A single point may still be chosen in some special cases, such as if the gravitational field is parallel or spherically symmetric. These cases are considered below.

=== Parallel fields ===
Some of the inhomogeneity in a gravitational field may be modeled by a variable but parallel field: g(r) = g(r)n, where n is some constant unit vector. Although a non-uniform gravitational field cannot be exactly parallel, this approximation can be valid if the body is sufficiently small. The center of gravity may then be defined as a certain weighted average of the locations of the particles composing the body. Whereas the center of mass averages over the mass of each particle, the center of gravity averages over the weight of each particle:

$$\mathbf{r}_\mathrm{cg} = \frac{1}{W} \sum_i w_i \mathbf{r}_i,$$

where w_{i} is the (scalar) weight of the ith particle and W is the (scalar) total weight of all the particles. This equation always has a unique solution, and in the parallel-field approximation, it is compatible with the torque requirement.

A common illustration concerns the Moon in the field of the Earth. Using the weighted-average definition, the Moon has a center of gravity that is lower (closer to the Earth) than its center of mass, because its lower portion is more strongly influenced by the Earth's gravity. This eventually lead to the Moon always showing the same face, a phenomenon known as tidal locking.

=== Spherically symmetric fields ===
If the external gravitational field is spherically symmetric, then it is equivalent to the field of a point mass M at the center of symmetry r. In this case, the center of gravity can be defined as the point at which the total force on the body is given by Newton's Law:

$$\frac {GmM (\mathbf{r}_\mathrm{cg} - \mathbf{r})} {|\mathbf{r}_\mathrm{cg} - \mathbf{r}|^3} = \mathbf{F},$$

where G is the gravitational constant and m is the mass of the body. As long as the total force is nonzero, this equation has a unique solution, and it satisfies the torque requirement. A convenient feature of this definition is that if the body is itself spherically symmetric, then r_{cg} lies at its center of mass. In general, as the distance between r and the body increases, the center of gravity approaches the center of mass.

Another way to view this definition is to consider the gravitational field of the body; then r_{cg} is the apparent source of gravitational attraction for an observer located at r. For this reason, r_{cg} is sometimes referred to as the center of gravity of M relative to the point r.

=== Usage ===
The centers of gravity defined above are not fixed points on the body; rather, they change as the position and orientation of the body changes. This characteristic makes the center of gravity difficult to work with, so the concept has little practical use.

When it is necessary to consider a gravitational torque, it is easier to represent gravity as a force acting at the center of mass, plus an orientation-dependent couple. The latter is best approached by treating the gravitational potential as a field.
