= Lami's theorem =

Equation in physics

In physics, Lami's theorem is an equation relating the magnitudes of three coplanar, concurrent and non-collinear force vectors, which keeps an object in static equilibrium, with the angles directly opposite to the corresponding vectors. According to the theorem,

$$\frac{v_A}{\sin \alpha}=\frac{v_B}{\sin \beta}=\frac{v_C}{\sin \gamma}$$

where $v_A, v_B, v_C$ are the magnitudes of the three coplanar, concurrent and non-collinear vectors, $\vec{v}_A, \vec{v}_B, \vec{v}_C$, which keep the object in static equilibrium, and $\alpha,\beta,\gamma$ are the angles directly opposite to the vectors, thus satisfying $\alpha+\beta+\gamma=360^o$.

Lami's theorem is applied in static analysis of mechanical and structural systems. The theorem is named after Bernard Lamy.

== Proof ==
As the vectors must balance $\vec{v}_A+\vec{v}_B+\vec{v}_C=\vec{0}$, hence by making all the vectors touch its tip and tail the result is a triangle with sides $v_A,v_B,v_C$ and angles $180^o -\alpha, 180^o -\beta, 180^o -\gamma$ ($\alpha,\beta,\gamma$ are the exterior angles).

By the law of sines then

$\frac{v_A}{\sin (180^o -\alpha)}=\frac{v_B}{\sin (180^o-\beta)}=\frac{v_C}{\sin (180^o-\gamma)}.$

Then by applying that for any angle $\theta$, $\sin (180^o - \theta) = \sin \theta$ (supplementary angles have the same sine), and the result is

$\frac{v_A}{\sin \alpha}=\frac{v_B}{\sin \beta}=\frac{v_C}{\sin \gamma}.$

== See also ==
- Mechanical equilibrium
- Parallelogram of force
- Tutte embedding
