= Resultant (disambiguation) =

A resultant is a mathematical tool allowing testing whether two polynomials have a common root.

As an adjective, resultant may refer to:

- resultant force, a physics concept
- resultant tone, a musical phenomenon
- resultant vector, the result of adding two or more vectors
