= Bernard Lamy =

French mathematician a theologian (1640–1715)

The Reverend Bernard Lamy CO
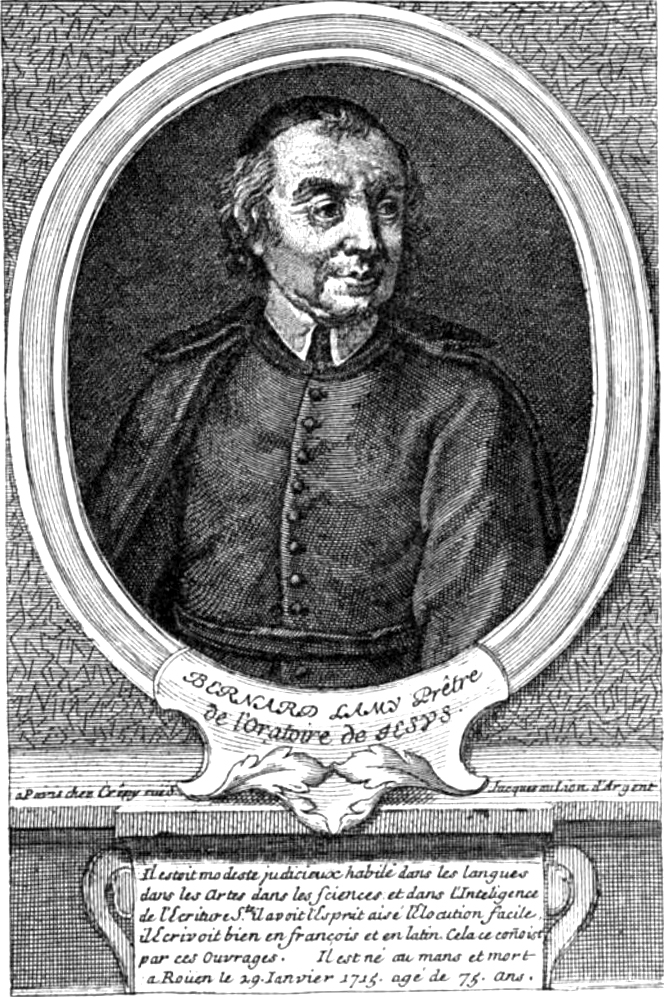
- Born: 15 June 1640; Le Mans, France
- Died: 29 January 1715 (aged 74); Rouen, France
- Known for: Parallelogram of force
- Scientific career
- Fields: Mathematics, theology
- Workplaces: College of Juilly, University of Angers

Bernard Lamy CO (French: [lami]; 15 June 1640 – 29 January 1715) was a French Oratorian Catholic priest, mathematician and theologian.

== Life ==
Lamy was born in Le Mans, France. After studying there, he went to join the Maison d'Institution in Paris, and to Saumur thereafter. In 1658 he entered the congregation of the Oratory.

Lamy became professor of classics at Vendôme in 1661, and at Juilly in 1663. He was ordained in 1667.

After teaching a few years at Le Mans he was appointed to a chair of philosophy in the University of Angers. Here his teaching was attacked on the ground that it was too exclusively Cartesian, and Rebous the rector obtained in 1675 from the state authorities a decree forbidding him to continue his lectures.

He was then sent by his superiors to Grenoble, where, thanks to the protection of Étienne Le Camus, he again took up his courses of philosophy. In 1686 he returned to Paris, stopping at the seminary of Saint Magloire, and in 1689 he was sent to Rouen, where he spent the remainder of his days to his death in 1715.

== Works ==
His best known work is the Traité de Mécanique (1679), showing the parallelogram of force. He also wrote Traité de la grandeur en general (1680) and Les éléments de géometrie (1685).

His writings are numerous and varied. Among them may be mentioned:

- La Rhétorique ou l'art de parler, (Paris, 1675); In English → (London, 1676) The Art of Speaking. Printed by William Godbid ( –1779); sold by Moses Pitt (c. 1639–1697), at the angel against the little north door of St. Paul's Church. 1676. – of this, twenty editions were published. (Note: Translated in English in 1676; modern edition in 1986 by John Thomas Harwood, Phd.)
- Apparatus ad Biblia Sacra, etc. (Grenoble, 1687), translated into French by order of the Bishop of Châlons under the title Introduction a la lecture de l'Ecriture Sainte (Lyons, 1689).
- Harmonia, sive Concordia quatuor Evangelistarum (Paris, 1689, A harmony or concordance of the Four Gospels). In this work he contends that John the Baptist was twice cast into prison, first in Jerusalem by order of the Sanhedrin, and later by Herod in Galilee. He maintains also that the Jesus and his Apostles did not eat the paschal lamb at the Last Supper, and that the Crucifixion occurred on the day on which the Jews celebrated the Passover. He considers Mary Magdalen, Mary the sister of Lazarus, and the sinner mentioned in Luke, vii, 37 sqq. to be one and the same person. These and other opinions involved him in controversy with Bulteau, pastor of Rouen, Jean Piénud, Le Nain de Tillemont, and others (see Traité historique de l'ancienne Pâque des Juifs, Paris, 1693).
- Apparatus Biblicus, which is a development of his introduction (Lyons, 1696; Jena, 1709; Amsterdam, 1710). It was translated into French by Jean-Baptiste Morvan de Bellegarde (Paris, 1697) and by Boyer (Lyons, 1709). In this work he calls in question the historical character of the book of Tobias and book of Judith, and maintains that even after the Council of Trent a difference of authority should be recognized between the proto-canonical and deutero-canonical books of the Bible.
- Défense de l'ancien sentiment de l'Eglise latine touchant l'office de sainte Madeleine (Rouen, Paris, 1697).
- A volume of commentaries on his previous concordance of the four Gospels (Paris, 1699).
- A Latin treatise on the Ark of the Covenant (Paris, 1720), a posthumous work published by Desmollets, who prefixed to the volume a biography of the author.

== See also ==
- College of Juilly
- Lami's theorem
- List of Roman Catholic scientist-clerics
