= Couple (mechanics) =

Pair of equal magnitude but opposite direction forces

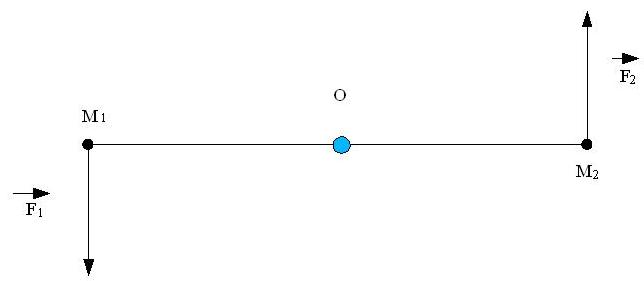
Two forces acting on opposite direction with equal magnitude.

In physics, a couple is a pair of forces that are equal in magnitude but opposite in their direction of action. A couple produces a pure rotational motion without any translational form.

== Simple couple ==
The simplest kind of couple consists of two equal and opposite forces whose lines of action do not coincide. This is called a "simple couple". The forces have a turning effect or moment called a torque about an axis which is normal (perpendicular) to the plane of the forces. The SI unit for the torque of the couple is newton metre.

If the two forces are F and −F, then the magnitude of the torque is given by the following formula:
$$\tau = F d$$
where

- $\tau$ is the moment of couple
- F is the magnitude of the force
- d is the perpendicular distance (moment) between the two parallel forces

The magnitude of the torque is equal to F • d, with the direction of the torque given by the unit vector $\hat{e}$, which is perpendicular to the plane containing the two forces and positive being a counter-clockwise couple. When d is taken as a vector between the points of action of the forces, then the torque is the cross product of d and F, i.e.
$$\mathbf{\tau} = | \mathbf{d} \times \mathbf{F} | .$$

== Independence of reference point ==
The moment of a force is only defined with respect to a certain point P (it is said to be the "moment about P") and, in general, when P is changed, the moment changes. However, the moment (torque) of a couple is independent of the reference point P: Any point will give the same moment. In other words, a couple, unlike any more general moments, is a "free vector". (This fact is called Varignon's Second Moment Theorem.)

The proof of this claim is as follows: Suppose there are a set of force vectors F_{1}, F_{2}, etc. that form a couple, with position vectors (about some origin P), r_{1}, r_{2}, etc., respectively. The moment about P is

$$M = \mathbf{r}_1\times \mathbf{F}_1 + \mathbf{r}_2\times \mathbf{F}_2 + \cdots$$

Now we pick a new reference point P' that differs from P by the vector r. The new moment is

$$M' = (\mathbf{r}_1+\mathbf{r})\times \mathbf{F}_1 + (\mathbf{r}_2+\mathbf{r})\times \mathbf{F}_2 + \cdots$$

Now the distributive property of the cross product implies

$$M' = \left(\mathbf{r}_1\times \mathbf{F}_1 + \mathbf{r}_2\times \mathbf{F}_2 + \cdots\right) + \mathbf{r}\times \left(\mathbf{F}_1 + \mathbf{F}_2 + \cdots \right).$$

However, the definition of a force couple means that

$$\mathbf{F}_1 + \mathbf{F}_2 + \cdots = 0.$$

Therefore,

$$M' = \mathbf{r}_1\times \mathbf{F}_1 + \mathbf{r}_2\times \mathbf{F}_2 + \cdots = M$$

This proves that the moment is independent of reference point, which is proof that a couple is a free vector.

== Forces and couples ==
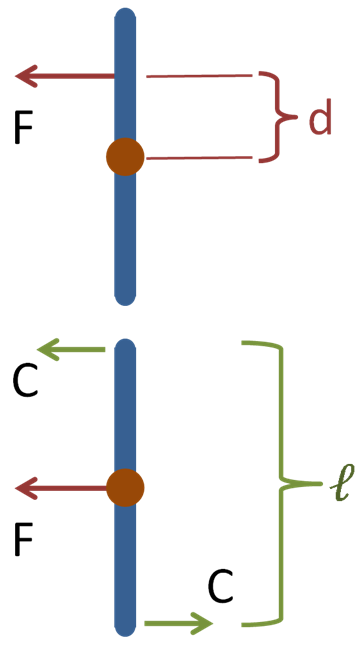

A force F applied to a rigid body at a distance d from the center of mass has the same effect as the same force applied directly to the center of mass and a couple Cℓ = Fd. The couple produces an angular acceleration of the rigid body at right angles to the plane of the couple. The force at the center of mass accelerates the body in the direction of the force without change in orientation. The general theorems are:

A single force acting at any point O′ of a rigid body can be replaced by an equal and parallel force F acting at any given point O and a couple with forces parallel to F whose moment is M = Fd, d being the separation of O and O′. Conversely, a couple and a force in the plane of the couple can be replaced by a single force, appropriately located.

Any couple can be replaced by another in the same plane of the same direction and moment, having any desired force or any desired arm.

== Applications ==
Couples are very important in engineering and the physical sciences. A few examples are:

- The forces exerted by one's hand on a screw-driver
- The forces exerted by the tip of a screwdriver on the head of a screw
- Drag forces acting on a spinning propeller
- Forces on an electric dipole in a uniform electric field
- The reaction control system on a spacecraft
- Force exerted by hands on steering wheel
- 'Rocking couples' are a regular imbalance giving rise to vibration

== See also ==
- Traction (engineering)
- Torque
- Moment (physics)
- Force
