= Statics =

Branch of mechanics concerned with balance of forces in nonmoving systems

Statics is the branch of classical mechanics that is concerned with the analysis of force and torque acting on a physical system that does not experience an acceleration, but rather is in equilibrium with its environment.

If $\textbf F$ is the total of the forces acting on the system, $m$ is the mass of the system and $\textbf a$ is the acceleration of the system, Newton's second law states that $\textbf F = m \textbf a \,$ (the bold font indicates a vector quantity, i.e. one with both magnitude and direction). If $\textbf a =0$, then $\textbf F = 0$. As for a system in static equilibrium, the acceleration equals zero, the system is either at rest, or its center of mass moves at constant velocity.

The application of the assumption of zero acceleration to the summation of moments acting on the system leads to $\textbf M = I \alpha = 0$, where $\textbf M$ is the summation of all moments acting on the system, $I$ is the moment of inertia of the mass and $\alpha$ is the angular acceleration of the system. For a system where $\alpha = 0$, it is also true that $\textbf M = 0.$

Together, the equations $\textbf F = m \textbf a = 0$ (the 'first condition for equilibrium') and $\textbf M = I \alpha = 0$ (the 'second condition for equilibrium') can be used to solve for unknown quantities acting on the system.

== History ==
Archimedes (c. 287–c. 212 BC) did pioneering work in statics. Later developments in the field of statics are found in works of Thebit.

== Background ==
=== Force ===
Force is the action of one body on another. A force is either a push or a pull, and it tends to move a body in the direction of its action. The action of a force is characterized by its magnitude, by the direction of its action, and by its point of application (or point of contact). Thus, force is a vector quantity, because its effect depends on the direction as well as on the magnitude of the action.

Forces are classified as either contact or body forces. A contact force is produced by direct physical contact; an example is the force exerted on a body by a supporting surface. A body force is generated by virtue of the position of a body within a force field such as a gravitational, electric, or magnetic field and is independent of contact with any other body; an example of a body force is the weight of a body in the Earth's gravitational field.

=== Moment of a force ===
In addition to the tendency to move a body in the direction of its application, a force can also tend to rotate a body about an axis. The axis may be any line which neither intersects nor is parallel to the line of action of the force. This rotational tendency is known as moment of force (M). Moment is also referred to as torque.

==== Moment about a point ====
Diagram of the moment arm of a force F.

The magnitude of the moment of a force at a point O, is equal to the perpendicular distance from O to the line of action of F, multiplied by the magnitude of the force: M = F · d, where

F = the force applied
d = the perpendicular distance from the axis to the line of action of the force. This perpendicular distance is called the moment arm.

The direction of the moment is given by the right hand rule, where counter clockwise (CCW) is out of the page, and clockwise (CW) is into the page. The moment direction may be accounted for by using a stated sign convention, such as a plus sign (+) for counterclockwise moments and a minus sign (−) for clockwise moments, or vice versa. Moments can be added together as vectors.

In vector format, the moment can be defined as the cross product between the radius vector, r (the vector from point O to the line of action), and the force vector, F:

$$\textbf{M}_{O}=\textbf{r} \times \textbf{F}$$
$$r=\left(
\begin{array}{cc}
x_{00} & ...  & x_{0j}\\
x_{01} & ...  & x_{1j}\\
... & ... & ... \\
x_{i0} & ...  & x_{ij}\\
\end{array}
\right)$$
$$F=\left(
\begin{array}{cc}
f_{00} & ...  & f_{0j}\\
f_{01} & ...  & f_{1j}\\
... & ... & ... \\
f_{i0} & ...  & f_{ij}\\
\end{array}
\right)$$

==== Varignon's theorem ====
Varignon's theorem states that the moment of a force about any point is equal to the sum of the moments of the components of the force about the same point.

=== Equilibrium equations ===
The static equilibrium of a particle is an important concept in statics. A particle is in equilibrium only if the resultant of all forces acting on the particle is equal to zero. In a rectangular coordinate system the equilibrium equations can be represented by three scalar equations, where the sums of forces in all three directions are equal to zero. An engineering application of this concept is determining the tensions of up to three cables under load, for example the forces exerted on each cable of a hoist lifting an object or of guy wires restraining a hot air balloon to the ground.

=== Moment of inertia ===
In classical mechanics, moment of inertia, also called mass moment, rotational inertia, polar moment of inertia of mass, or the angular mass, (SI units kg·m²) is a measure of an object's resistance to changes to its rotation. It is the inertia of a rotating body with respect to its rotation. The moment of inertia plays much the same role in rotational dynamics as mass does in linear dynamics, describing the relationship between angular momentum and angular velocity, torque and angular acceleration, and several other quantities. The symbols I and J are usually used to refer to the moment of inertia or polar moment of inertia.

While a simple scalar treatment of the moment of inertia suffices for many situations, a more advanced tensor treatment allows the analysis of such complicated systems as spinning tops and gyroscopic motion.

The concept was introduced by Leonhard Euler in his 1765 book Theoria motus corporum solidorum seu rigidorum; he discussed the moment of inertia and many related concepts, such as the principal axis of inertia.

== Applications ==
=== Solids ===
Statics is used in the analysis of structures, for instance in architectural and structural engineering. Strength of materials is a related field of mechanics that relies heavily on the application of static equilibrium. A key concept is the center of gravity of a body at rest: it represents an imaginary point at which all the mass of a body resides. The position of the point relative to the foundations on which a body lies determines its stability in response to external forces. If the center of gravity exists outside the foundations, then the body is unstable because there is a torque acting: any small disturbance will cause the body to fall or topple. If the center of gravity exists within the foundations, the body is stable since no net torque acts on the body. If the center of gravity coincides with the foundations, then the body is said to be metastable.

=== Fluids ===
Hydrostatics, also known as fluid statics, is the study of fluids at rest (i.e. in static equilibrium). The characteristic of any fluid at rest is that the force exerted on any particle of the fluid is the same at all points at the same depth (or altitude) within the fluid. If the net force is greater than zero the fluid will move in the direction of the resulting force. This concept was first formulated in a slightly extended form by French mathematician and philosopher Blaise Pascal in 1647 and became known as Pascal's law. It has many important applications in hydraulics. Archimedes, Abū Rayhān al-Bīrūnī, Al-Khazini and Galileo Galilei were also major figures in the development of hydrostatics.

== See also ==
- Cremona diagram
- Dynamics
- Solid mechanics
