= Line of action =

Geometric representation of a force on an object

The line of action is shown as the vertical dotted line. It extends in both directions relative to the force vector, but is most useful where it defines the moment arm.

In physics, the line of action (also called line of application) of a force (F→) is a geometric representation of how the force is applied. It is the straight line through the point at which the force is applied, and is in the same direction as the vector F→. The lever arm is the perpendicular distance from the axis of rotation to the line of action.

The concept is essential, for instance, for understanding the net effect of multiple forces applied to a body. For example, if two forces of equal magnitude act upon a rigid body along the same line of action but in opposite directions, they cancel and have no net effect. But if, instead, their lines of action are not identical, but merely parallel, then their effect is to create a moment on the body, which tends to rotate it.

== Calculation of torque ==
For the simple geometry associated with the figure, there are three equivalent equations for the magnitude of the torque associated with a force $\vec F$ directed at displacement $\vec r$ from the axis whenever the force is perpendicular to the axis:

$$\begin{align}
||\vec\tau|| & = ||\vec r\times\vec F||  \\
& = rF_\perp   \\
& = r_\perp F  \\
& = ||r F \sin\theta|| \,,
\end{align}$$

where $\vec r\times\vec F$ is the cross-product, $F_\perp$ is the component of $\vec F$ perpendicular to $\hat r$, $r_\perp$ is the moment arm, and $\theta$ is the angle between $\vec r$ and $\vec F$.
