= Structural engineering =

Branch of civil engineering dealing with man-made structures

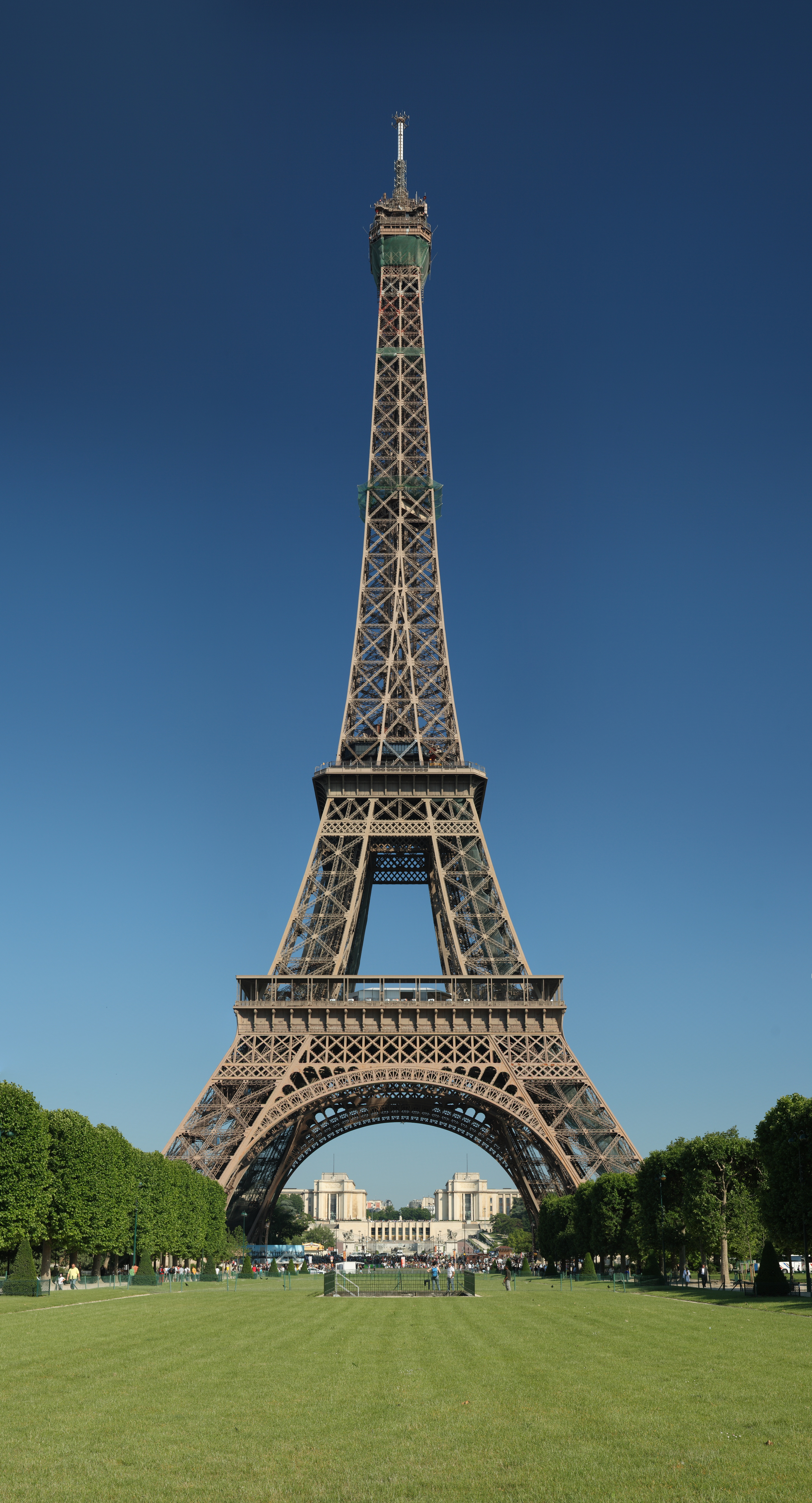
The Eiffel Tower in Paris is a historical achievement of structural engineering.

Structural engineering is a sub-discipline of civil engineering in which structural engineers are trained to design the 'bones and joints' that create the form and shape of human-made structures. Structural engineers also must understand and calculate the stability, strength, rigidity and earthquake-susceptibility of built structures for buildings and nonbuilding structures. The structural designs are integrated with those of other designers such as architects and building services engineer and often supervise the construction of projects by contractors on site. They can also be involved in the design of machinery, medical equipment, and vehicles where structural integrity affects functioning and safety. See glossary of structural engineering.

Structural engineering theory is based upon applied physical laws and empirical knowledge of the structural performance of different materials and geometries. Structural engineering design uses a number of relatively simple structural concepts to build complex structural systems. Structural engineers are responsible for making creative and efficient use of funds, structural elements and materials to achieve these goals.

== History ==
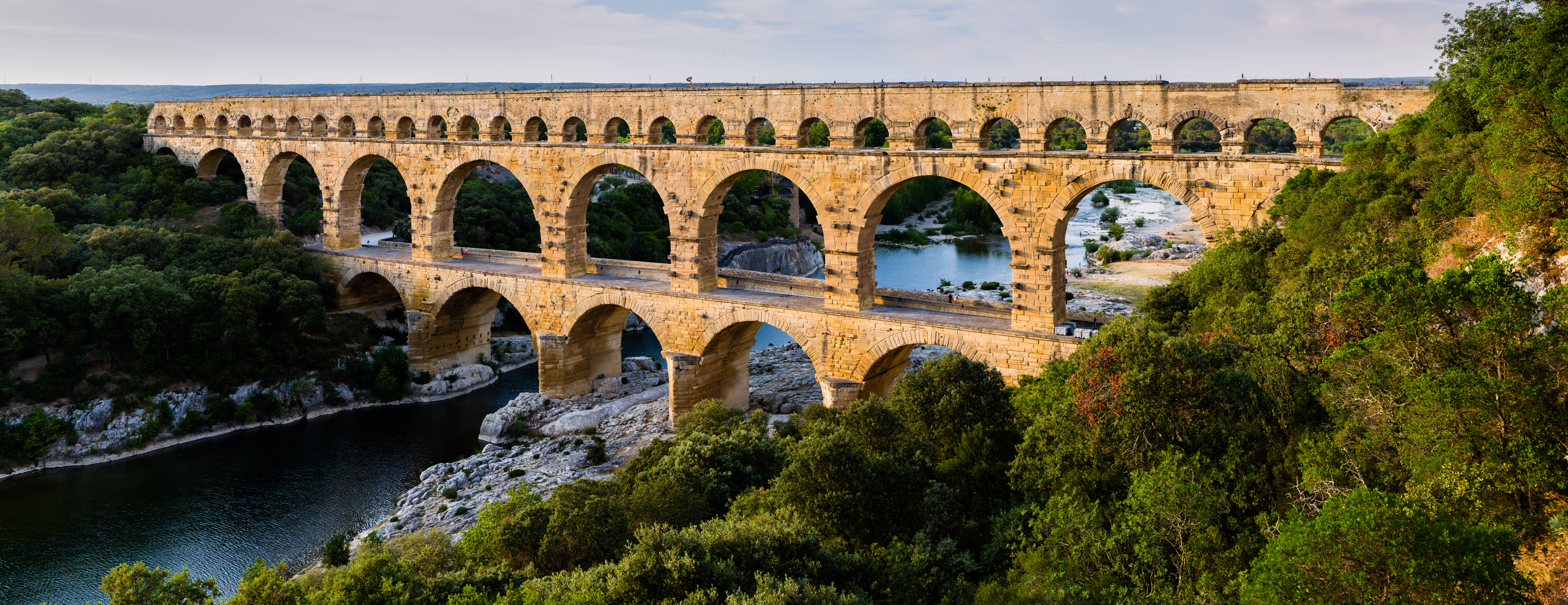
Pont du Gard, France, a Roman era aqueduct circa 19 BC

Structural engineering dates back to 2700 B.C., when the step pyramid for Pharaoh Djoser was built by Imhotep, the first engineer in history known by name. Pyramids were the most common major structures built by ancient civilizations because the structural form of a pyramid is inherently stable and can be almost infinitely scaled (as opposed to most other structural forms, which cannot be linearly increased in size in proportion to increased loads).

The structural stability of the pyramid, whilst primarily gained from its shape, relies also on the strength of the stone from which it is constructed, and its ability to support the weight of the stone above it. The limestone blocks were often taken from a quarry near the building site and have a compressive strength from 30 to 250 MPa (MPa = Pa × 10^{6}). Therefore, the structural strength of the pyramid stems from the material properties of the stones from which it was built rather than the pyramid's geometry.

Throughout ancient and medieval history most architectural design and construction were carried out by artisans, such as stonemasons and carpenters, rising to the role of master builder. No theory of structures existed, and understanding of how structures stood up was extremely limited, and based almost entirely on empirical evidence of 'what had worked before' and intuition. Knowledge was retained by guilds and seldom supplanted by advances. Structures were repetitive, and increases in scale were incremental.

No record exists of the first calculations of the strength of structural members or the behavior of structural material, but the profession of a structural engineer only really took shape with the Industrial Revolution and the re-invention of concrete (see History of Concrete). The physical sciences underlying structural engineering began to be understood in the Renaissance and have since developed into computer-based applications pioneered in the 1970s.

=== Timeline ===
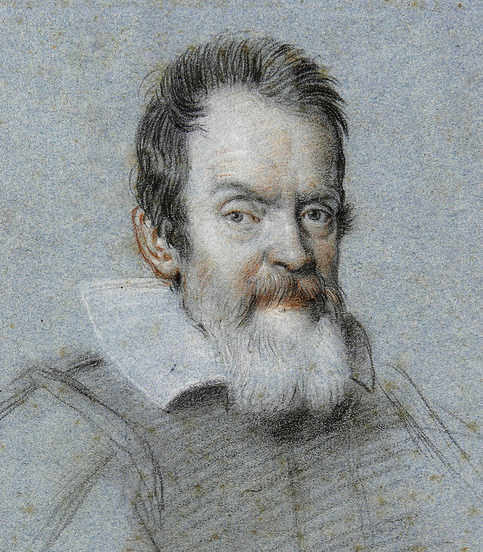
Galileo Galilei published the book Two New Sciences in which he examined the failure of simple structures.

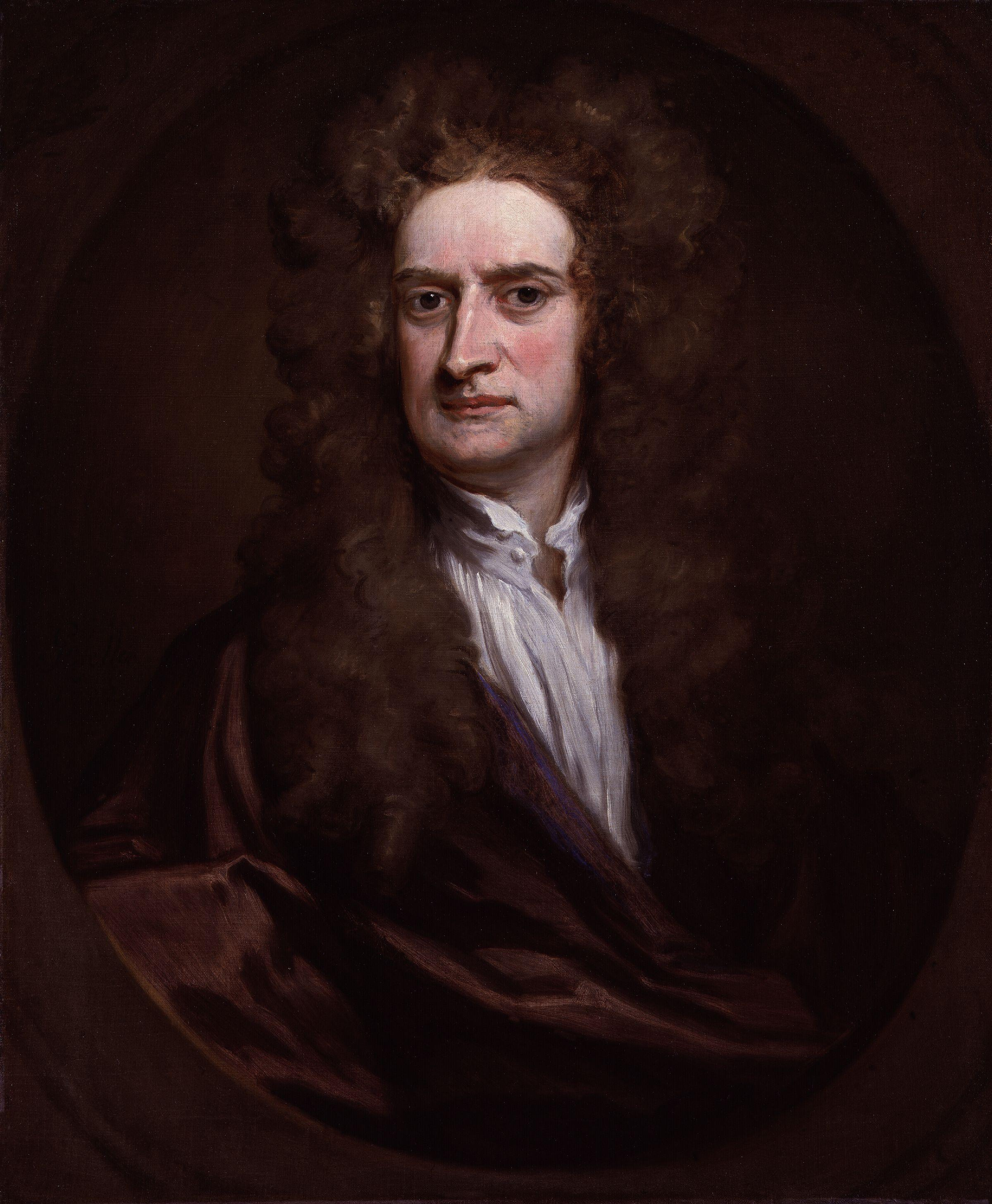
Isaac Newton published Philosophiae Naturalis Principia Mathematica, which contains his laws of motion.

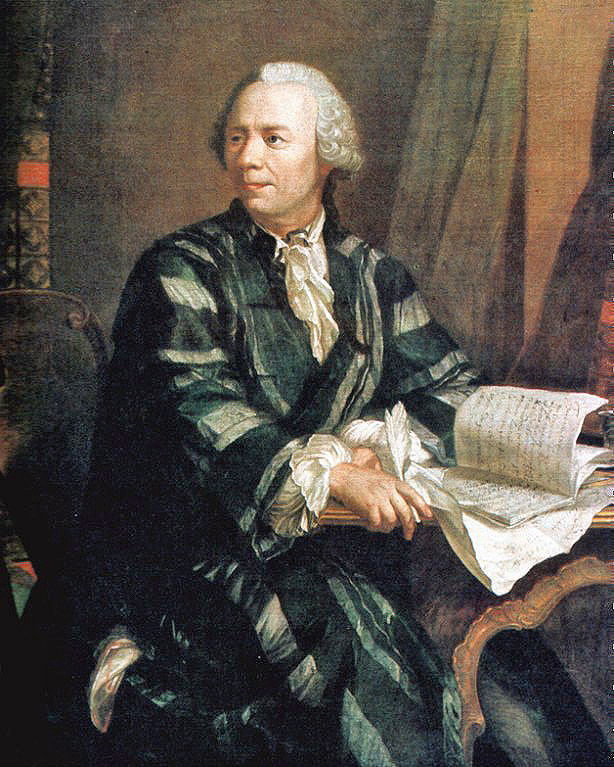
Leonhard Euler developed the theory of buckling of columns.

- 1452–1519 Leonardo da Vinci made many contributions.
- 1638: Galileo Galilei published the book Two New Sciences in which he examined the failure of simple structures.
- 1660: Hooke's law by Robert Hooke.
- 1687: Isaac Newton published Philosophiæ Naturalis Principia Mathematica, which contains his laws of motion.
- 1750: Euler–Bernoulli beam equation.
- 1700–1782: Daniel Bernoulli introduced the principle of virtual work.
- 1707–1783: Leonhard Euler developed the theory of buckling of columns.
- 1826: Claude-Louis Navier published a treatise on the elastic behaviors of structures.
- 1873: Carlo Alberto Castigliano presented his dissertation "Intorno ai sistemi elastici", which contains his theorem for computing displacement as the partial derivative of the strain energy. This theorem includes the method of "least work" as a special case.
- 1874: Otto Mohr formalized the idea of a statically indeterminate structure.
- 1922: Timoshenko corrects the Euler–Bernoulli beam equation.
- 1936: Hardy Cross' publication of the moment distribution method, an important innovation in the design of continuous frames.
- 1941: Alexander Hrennikoff solved the discretization of plane elasticity problems using a lattice framework.
- 1942: Richard Courant divided a domain into finite subregions.
- 1956: J. Turner, R. W. Clough, H. C. Martin, and L. J. Topp's paper on the "Stiffness and Deflection of Complex Structures" introduces the name "finite-element method" and is widely recognized as the first comprehensive treatment of the method as it is known today.

=== Structural failure ===
The history of structural engineering contains many collapses and failures. Sometimes this is due to obvious negligence, as in the case of the Pétion-Ville school collapse, in which Rev. Fortin Augustin " constructed the building all by himself, saying he didn't need an engineer as he had good knowledge of construction" following a partial collapse of the three-story schoolhouse that sent neighbors fleeing. The final collapse killed 94 people, mostly children.

In other cases structural failures require careful study, and the results of these inquiries have resulted in improved practices and a greater understanding of the science of structural engineering. Some such studies are the result of forensic engineering investigations where the original engineer seems to have done everything in accordance with the state of the profession and acceptable practice yet a failure still eventuated. A famous case of structural knowledge and practice being advanced in this manner can be found in a series of failures involving box girders which collapsed in Australia during the 1970s.

== Theory ==
Figure of a bolt in shear stress. Top figure illustrates single shear, bottom figure illustrates double shear.

Structural engineering depends upon a detailed knowledge of applied mechanics, materials science, and applied mathematics to understand and predict how structures support and resist self-weight and imposed loads. To apply the knowledge successfully a structural engineer generally requires detailed knowledge of relevant empirical and theoretical design codes, the techniques of structural analysis, as well as some knowledge of the corrosion resistance of the materials and structures, especially when those structures are exposed to the external environment. Since the 1990s, specialist software has become available to aid in the design of structures, with the functionality to assist in the drawing, analyzing and designing of structures with maximum precision; examples include AutoCAD, StaadPro, ETABS, Prokon, Revit Structure, Inducta RCB, etc. Such software may also take into consideration environmental loads, such as earthquakes and winds.

== Profession ==
Structural engineers are responsible for engineering design and structural analysis. Entry-level structural engineers may design the individual structural elements of a structure, such as the beams and columns of a building. More experienced engineers may be responsible for the structural design and integrity of an entire system, such as a building.

Structural engineers often specialize in particular types of structures, such as buildings, bridges, pipelines, industrial constructions, tunnels, vehicles, ships, aircraft, and spacecraft. Structural engineers who specialize in buildings may specialize in particular construction materials such as concrete, steel, wood, masonry, alloys and composites.

Structural engineering has existed since humans first started to construct their structures. It became a more defined and formalized profession with the emergence of architecture as a distinct profession from engineering during the industrial revolution in the late 19th century. Until then, the architect and the structural engineer were usually one and the same thing – the master builder. Only with the development of specialized knowledge of structural theories that emerged during the 19th and early 20th centuries, did the professional structural engineers come into existence.

The role of a structural engineer today involves a significant understanding of both static and dynamic loading and the structures that are available to resist them. The complexity of modern structures often requires a great deal of creativity from the engineer in order to ensure the structures support and resist the loads they are subjected to. A structural engineer will typically have a four or five-year undergraduate degree, followed by a minimum of three years of professional practice before being considered fully qualified. Structural engineers are licensed or accredited by different learned societies and regulatory bodies around the world (for example, the Institution of Structural Engineers in the UK). Depending on the degree course they have studied and/or the jurisdiction they are seeking licensure in, they may be accredited (or licensed) as just structural engineers, or as civil engineers, or as both civil and structural engineers. Another international organisation is IABSE(International Association for Bridge and Structural Engineering). The aim of that association is to exchange knowledge and to advance the practice of structural engineering worldwide in the service of the profession and society.

== Specializations ==
=== Building structures ===
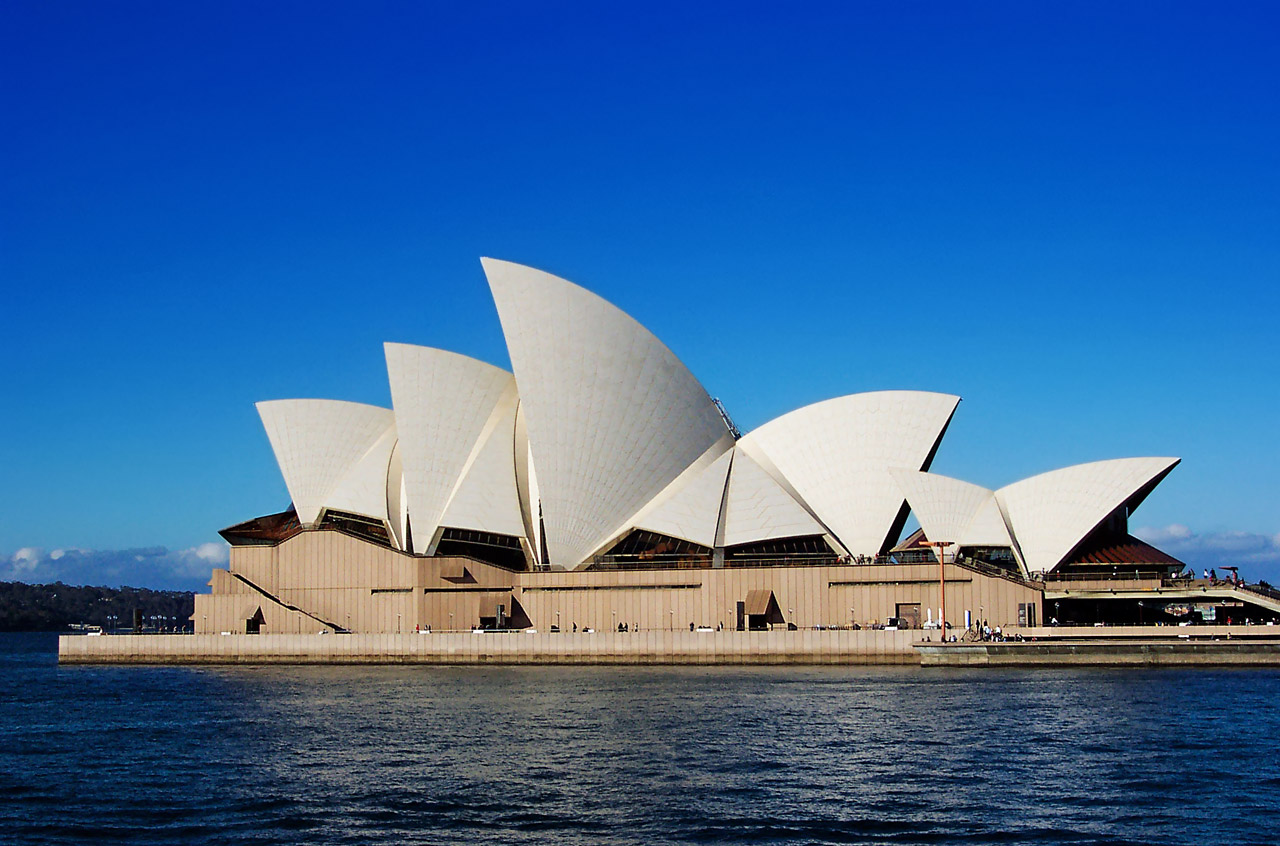
Sydney Opera House, designed by Architect Jørn Utzon and structural design by Ove Arup & Partners

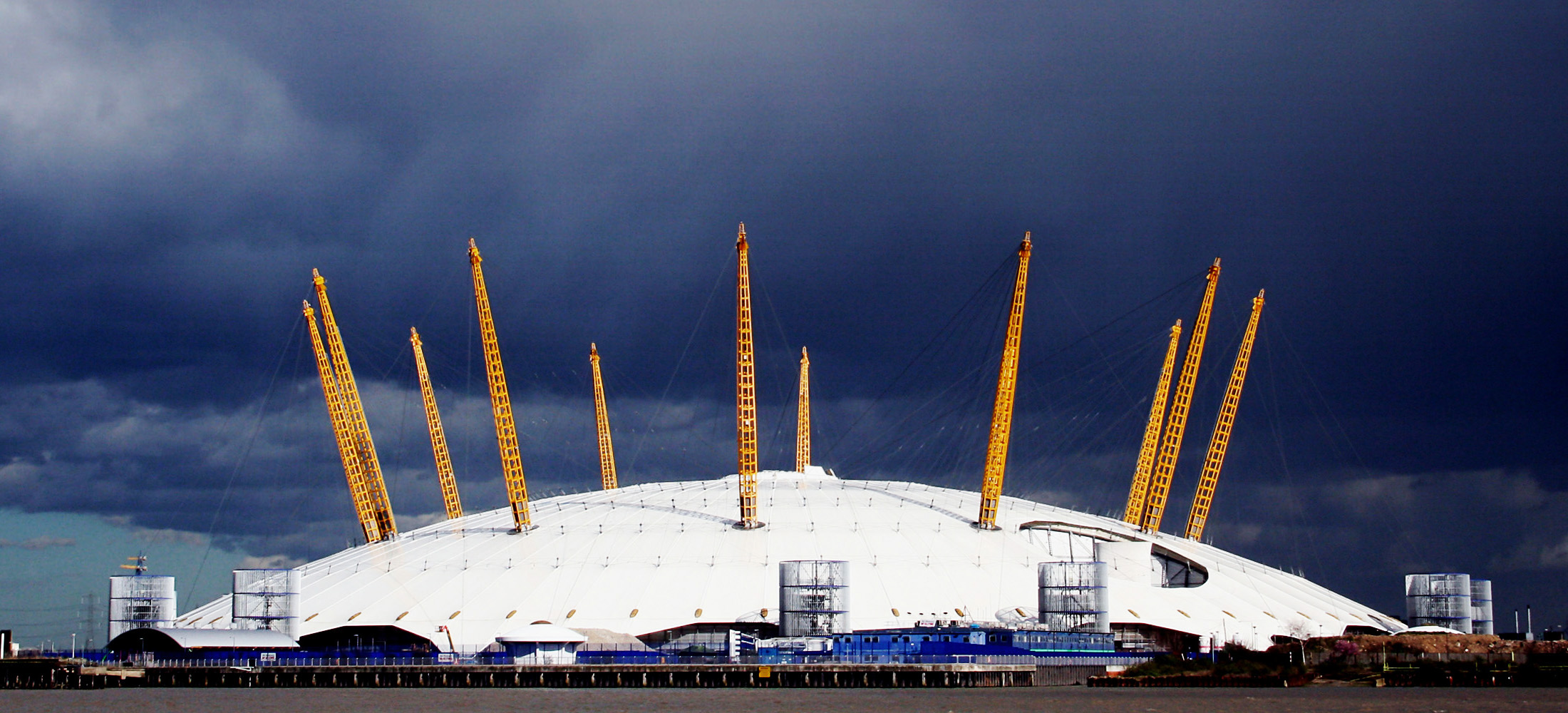
Millennium Dome in London, England designed by Richard Rogers and Buro Happold

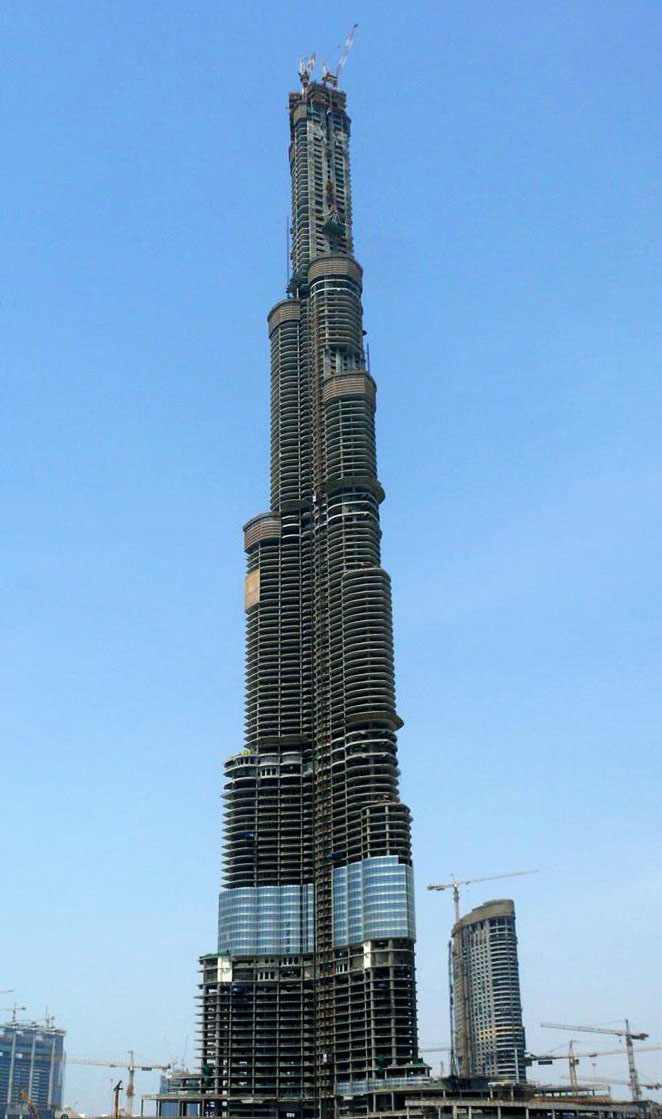
Burj Khalifa, in Dubai, the world's tallest building under construction in 2007

Structural building engineering is primarily driven by the creative manipulation of materials and forms and the underlying mathematical and scientific ideas to achieve an end that fulfills its functional requirements and is structurally safe when subjected to all the loads it could reasonably be expected to experience. This is subtly different from architectural design, which is driven by the creative manipulation of materials and forms, mass, space, volume, texture, and light to achieve an end which is aesthetic, functional, and often artistic.

The structural design for a building must ensure that the building can stand up safely, able to function without excessive deflections or movements which may cause fatigue of structural elements, cracking or failure of fixtures, fittings or partitions, or discomfort for occupants. It must account for movements and forces due to temperature, creep, cracking, and imposed loads. It must also ensure that the design is practically buildable within acceptable manufacturing tolerances of the materials. It must allow the architecture to work, and the building services to fit within the building and function (air conditioning, ventilation, smoke extract, electrics, lighting, etc.). The structural design of a modern building can be extremely complex and often requires a large team to complete.

Structural engineering specialties for buildings include:

- Earthquake engineering
- Façade engineering
- Fire engineering
- Roof engineering
- Tower engineering
- Wind engineering

=== Earthquake engineering structures ===
Earthquake engineering structures are those engineered to withstand earthquakes.

Earthquake-proof pyramid El Castillo, Chichen Itza

The main objectives of earthquake engineering are to understand the interaction of structures with the shaking ground, foresee the consequences of possible earthquakes, and design and construct the structures to perform during an earthquake.

Earthquake-proof structures are not necessarily extremely strong like the El Castillo pyramid at Chichen Itza shown above.

One important tool of earthquake engineering is base isolation, which allows the base of a structure to move freely with the ground.

=== Civil engineering structures ===
Civil structural engineering includes all structural engineering related to the built environment. It includes:

- Bridges
- Dams
- Earthworks
- Foundations
- Offshore structures
- Pipelines
- Power stations
- Railways
- Retaining structures and walls
- Roads
- Tunnels
- Waterways
- Reservoirs
- Water and wastewater infrastructure

The structural engineer is the lead designer on these structures, and often the sole designer. In the design of structures such as these, structural safety is of paramount importance (in the UK, designs for dams, nuclear power stations and bridges must be signed off by a chartered engineer).

Civil engineering structures are often subjected to very extreme forces, such as large variations in temperature, dynamic loads such as waves or traffic, or high pressures from water or compressed gases. They are also often constructed in corrosive environments, such as at sea, in industrial facilities, or below ground.

=== Mechanical engineering structures ===
The forces which parts of a machine are subjected to can vary significantly and can do so at a great rate. The forces which a boat or aircraft are subjected to vary enormously and will do so thousands of times over the structure's lifetime. The structural design must ensure that such structures can endure such loading for their entire design life without failing.

These works can require mechanical structural engineering:

- Boilers and pressure vessels
- Coachworks and carriages
- Cranes
- Elevators
- Escalators
- Marine vessels and hulls

=== Aerospace structures ===
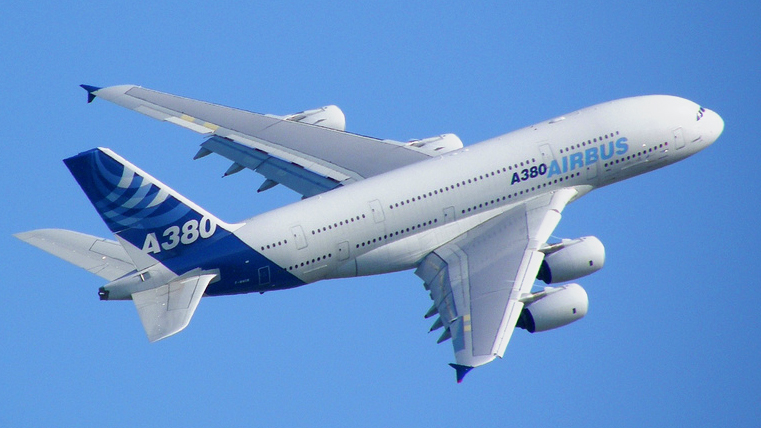
An Airbus A380, the world's largest passenger airliner

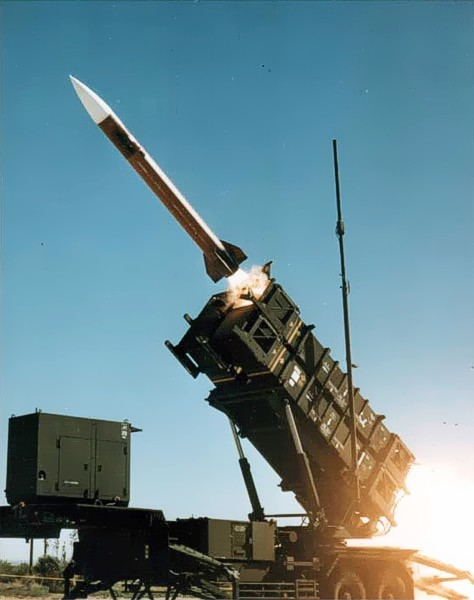
Design of missile needs in depth understanding of Structural Analysis

Aerospace structure types include launch vehicles, (Atlas, Delta, Titan), missiles (ALCM, Harpoon), Hypersonic vehicles (Space Shuttle), military aircraft (F-16, F-18) and commercial aircraft (Boeing 777, MD-11). Aerospace structures typically consist of thin plates with stiffeners for the external surfaces, bulkheads, and frames to support the shape and fasteners such as welds, rivets, screws, and bolts to hold the components together.

=== Nanoscale structures ===
A nanostructure is an object of intermediate size between molecular and microscopic (micrometer-sized) structures. In describing nanostructures it is necessary to differentiate between the number of dimensions on the nanoscale. Nanotextured surfaces have one dimension on the nanoscale, i.e., only the thickness of the surface of an object is between 0.1 and 100 nm. Nanotubes have two dimensions on the nanoscale, i.e., the diameter of the tube is between 0.1 and 100 nm; its length could be much greater. Finally, spherical nanoparticles have three dimensions on the nanoscale, i.e., the particle is between 0.1 and 100 nm in each spatial dimension. The terms nanoparticles and ultrafine particles (UFP) often are used synonymously although UFP can reach into the micrometer range. The term 'nanostructure' is often used when referring to magnetic technology.

=== Structural engineering for medical science ===
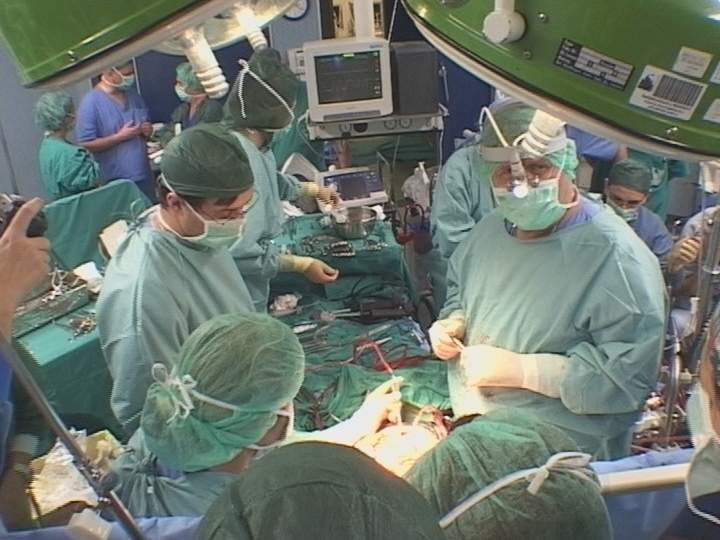
Designing medical equipment needs in-depth understanding of structural engineering

Medical equipment (also known as armamentarium) is designed to aid in the diagnosis, monitoring or treatment of medical conditions. There are several basic types: diagnostic equipment includes medical imaging machines, used to aid in diagnosis; equipment includes infusion pumps, medical lasers, and LASIK surgical machines; medical monitors allow medical staff to measure a patient's medical state. Monitors may measure patient vital signs and other parameters including ECG, EEG, blood pressure, and dissolved gases in the blood; diagnostic medical equipment may also be used in the home for certain purposes, e.g. for the control of diabetes mellitus. A biomedical equipment technician (BMET) is a vital component of the healthcare delivery system. Employed primarily by hospitals, BMETs are the people responsible for maintaining a facility's medical equipment.

== Structural elements ==
A statically determinate simply supported beam, bending under an evenly distributed load

Any structure is essentially made up of only a small number of different types of elements:

- Columns
- Beams
- Plates
- Arches
- Shells
- Catenaries

Many of these elements can be classified according to form (straight, plane / curve) and dimensionality (one-dimensional / two-dimensional):

	One-dimensional		Two-dimensional	
	straight	curve	plane	curve
(predominantly) bending	beam	continuous arch	plate, concrete slab	lamina, dome
(predominant) tensile stress	rope, tie	Catenary	shell	
(predominant) compression	pier, column		Load-bearing wall	

=== Columns ===
Columns are elements that carry only axial force (compression) or both axial force and bending (which is technically called a beam-column but practically, just a column). The design of a column must check the axial capacity of the element and the buckling capacity.

The buckling capacity is the capacity of the element to withstand the propensity to buckle. Its capacity depends upon its geometry, material, and the effective length of the column, which depends upon the restraint conditions at the top and bottom of the column. The effective length is $K*l$ where $l$ is the real length of the column and K is the factor dependent on the restraint conditions.

The capacity of a column to carry axial load depends on the degree of bending it is subjected to, and vice versa. This is represented on an interaction chart and is a complex non-linear relationship.

=== Beams ===
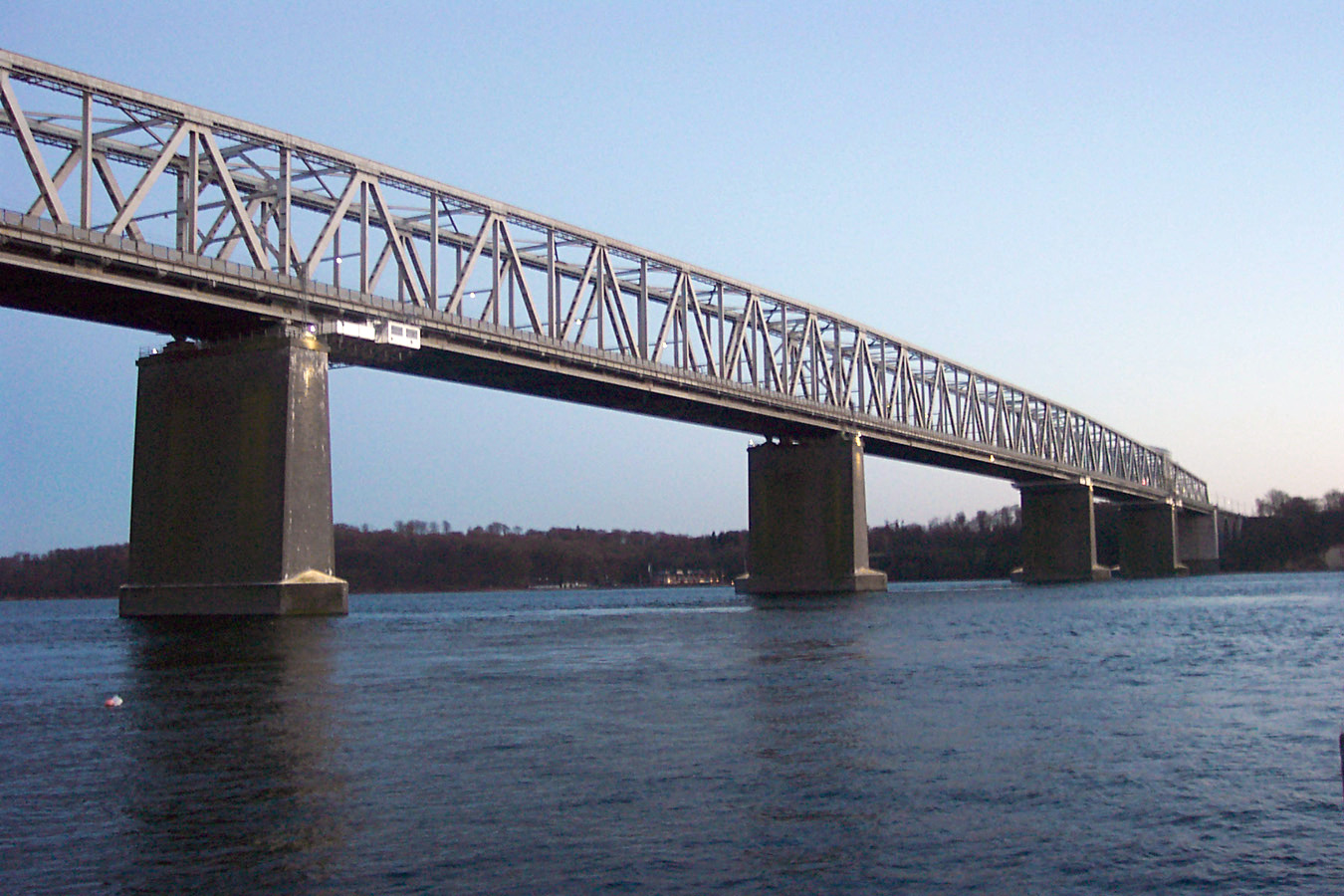
Little Belt: a truss bridge in Denmark

A beam may be defined as an element in which one dimension is much greater than the other two and the applied loads are usually normal to the main axis of the element. Beams and columns are called line elements and are often represented by simple lines in structural modeling.

- cantilevered (supported at one end only with a fixed connection)
- simply supported (fixed against vertical translation at each end and horizontal translation at one end only, and able to rotate at the supports)
- fixed (supported in all directions for translation and rotation at each end)
- continuous (supported by three or more supports)
- a combination of the above (ex. supported at one end and in the middle)

Beams are elements that carry pure bending only. Bending causes one part of the section of a beam (divided along its length) to go into compression and the other part into tension. The compression part must be designed to resist buckling and crushing, while the tension part must be able to adequately resist the tension.

=== Trusses ===
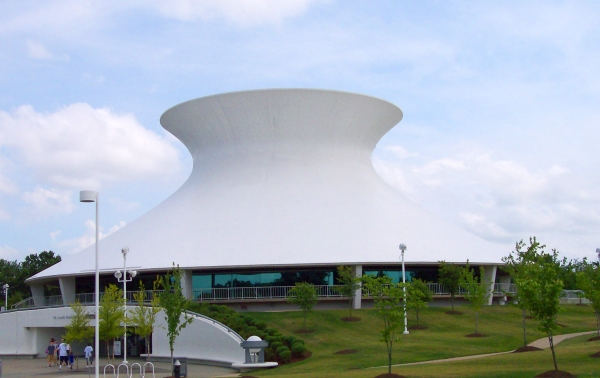
The McDonnell Planetarium by Gyo Obata in St Louis, Missouri, USA, a concrete shell structure

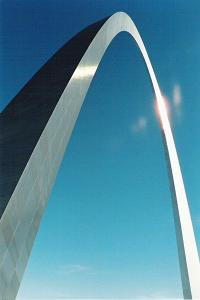
The 630 foot (192 m) high, stainless-clad (type 304) Gateway Arch in St. Louis, Missouri

A truss is a structure comprising members and connection points or nodes. When members are connected at nodes and forces are applied at nodes members can act in tension or compression. Members acting in compression are referred to as compression members or struts while members acting in tension are referred to as tension members or ties. Most trusses use gusset plates to connect intersecting elements. Gusset plates are relatively flexible and unable to transfer bending moments. The connection is usually arranged so that the lines of force in the members are coincident at the joint thus allowing the truss members to act in pure tension or compression.

Trusses are usually used in large-span structures, where it would be uneconomical to use solid beams.

=== Plates ===
Plates carry bending in two directions. A concrete flat slab is an example of a plate. Plate behavior is based on continuum mechanics. Due to the complexity involved they are most often analyzed using a finite element analysis.

They can also be designed with yield line theory, where an assumed collapse mechanism is analyzed to give an upper bound on the collapse load. This technique is used in practice but because the method provides an upper-bound (i.e. an unsafe prediction of the collapse load) for poorly conceived collapse mechanisms, great care is needed to ensure that the assumed collapse mechanism is realistic.

=== Shells ===
Shells derive their strength from their form and carry forces in compression in two directions. A dome is an example of a shell. They can be designed by making a hanging-chain model, which will act as a catenary in pure tension and inverting the form to achieve pure compression.

=== Arches ===
Arches carry forces in compression in one direction only, which is why it is appropriate to build arches out of masonry. They are designed by ensuring that the line of thrust of the force remains within the depth of the arch. It is mainly used to increase the bountifulness of any structure.

=== Catenaries ===
Catenaries derive their strength from their form and carry transverse forces in pure tension by deflecting (just as a tightrope will sag when someone walks on it). They are almost always cable or fabric structures. A fabric structure acts as a catenary in two directions.

== Materials ==
Structural engineering depends on the knowledge of materials and their properties, in order to understand how different materials support and resist loads. It also involves a knowledge of Corrosion engineering to avoid for example galvanic coupling of dissimilar materials.

Common structural materials are:

- Iron: wrought iron, cast iron
- Concrete: reinforced concrete, prestressed concrete, ultra-high performance concrete
- Alloy: steel, stainless steel
- Masonry
- Timber: hardwood, softwood
- Aluminium
- Composite materials: plywood
- Other structural materials: adobe, bamboo, carbon fibre, fiber reinforced plastic, mudbrick, roofing materials

== See also ==
- Glossary of structural engineering
- Aircraft structures
- Architects
- Architectural engineering
- Building officials
- Building services engineering
- Civil engineering
- Construction engineering
- Corrosion engineering
- Earthquake engineering
- Forensic engineering
- Index of structural engineering articles
- List of bridge disasters
- List of structural engineers
- List of structural engineering software
- Mechanical engineering
- Nanostructure
- Prestressed structure
- Structurae
- Structural engineer
- Structural engineering software
- Structural fracture mechanics
- Structural failure
- Structural robustness
- Structural steel
- Structural testing
