= Structural analysis =

Calculation of structural loads

Structural analysis is a branch of solid mechanics which uses simplified models for solids like bars, beams and shells for engineering decision making. Its main objective is to determine the effect of loads on physical structures and their components. In contrast to theory of elasticity, the models used in structural analysis are often differential equations in one spatial variable. Structures subject to this type of analysis include all that must withstand loads, such as buildings, bridges, aircraft and ships. Structural analysis uses ideas from applied mechanics, materials science and applied mathematics to compute a structure's deformations, internal forces, stresses, support reactions, velocity, accelerations, and stability. The results of the analysis are used to verify a structure's fitness for use, often precluding physical tests. Structural analysis is thus a key part of the engineering design of structures.

== Structures and loads ==
In the context to structural analysis, a structure refers to a body or system of connected parts used to support a load. Important examples related to Civil Engineering include buildings, bridges, and towers; and in other branches of engineering, ship and aircraft frames, tanks, pressure vessels, mechanical systems, and electrical supporting structures are important. To design a structure, an engineer must account for its safety, aesthetics, and serviceability, while considering economic and environmental constraints. Other branches of engineering work on a wide variety of non-building structures.

=== Classification of structures ===
A 'structural system' is the combination of structural elements and their materials. It is important for a structural engineer to be able to classify a structure by either its form or its function, by recognizing the various elements composing that structure.

The structural elements guiding the systemic forces through the materials are not only such as a connecting rod, a truss, a beam, or a column, but also a cable, an arch, a cavity or channel, and even an angle, a surface structure, or a frame.

=== Loads ===
Once the dimensional requirement for a structure have been defined, it becomes necessary to determine the loads the structure must support. Structural design, therefore begins with specifying loads that act on the structure. The design loading for a structure is often specified in building codes. There are two types of codes: general building codes and design codes, engineers must satisfy all of the code's requirements in order for the structure to remain reliable.

There are two types of loads that structure engineering must encounter in the design. The first type of loads are dead loads that consist of the weights of the various structural members and the weights of any objects that are permanently attached to the structure. For example, columns, beams, girders, the floor slab, roofing, walls, windows, plumbing, electrical fixtures, and other miscellaneous attachments. The second type of loads are live loads which vary in their magnitude and location. There are many different types of live loads like building loads, highway bridge loads, railroad bridge loads, impact loads, wind loads, snow loads, earthquake loads, and other natural loads.

== Analytical methods ==
To perform an accurate analysis a structural engineer must determine information such as structural loads, geometry, support conditions, and material properties. The results of such an analysis typically include support reactions, stresses and displacements. This information is then compared to criteria that indicate the conditions of failure. Advanced structural analysis may examine dynamic response, stability and non-linear behavior. There are three approaches to the analysis:

1. the mechanics of materials approach (also known as strength of materials),
2. the elasticity theory approach (which is actually a special case of the more general field of continuum mechanics), and
3. the finite element method (FEM).

The first two make use of analytical formulations which apply mostly simple linear elastic models, leading to closed-form solutions, and can often be solved by hand. The finite element approach is actually a numerical method for solving differential equations generated by theories of mechanics such as elasticity theory and strength of materials. However, the FEM depends heavily on the processing power of computers and is more applicable to structures of arbitrary size and complexity.

Regardless of approach, the formulation is based on the same three fundamental relations: equilibrium, constitutive, and compatibility. The solutions are approximate when any of these relations are only approximately satisfied, or only an approximation of reality.

=== Limitations ===
Each method has noteworthy limitations. The method of mechanics of materials is limited to very simple structural elements under relatively simple loading conditions. The structural elements and loading conditions allowed, however, are sufficient to solve many useful engineering problems. The theory of elasticity allows the solution of structural elements of general geometry under general loading conditions, in principle. Analytical solution, however, is limited to relatively simple cases. The solution of elasticity problems also requires the solution of a system of partial differential equations, which is considerably more mathematically demanding than the solution of mechanics of materials problems, which require at most the solution of an ordinary differential equation. The finite element method is perhaps the most restrictive and most useful at the same time. This method itself relies upon other structural theories (such as the other two discussed here) for equations to solve. It does, however, make it generally possible to solve these equations, even with highly complex geometry and loading conditions, with the restriction that there is always some numerical error. Effective and reliable use of this method requires a solid understanding of its limitations.

== Strength of materials methods (classical methods) ==
The simplest of the three methods here discussed, the mechanics of materials method is available for simple structural members subject to specific loadings such as axially loaded bars, prismatic beams in a state of pure bending, and circular shafts subject to torsion. The solutions can under certain conditions be superimposed using the superposition principle to analyze a member undergoing combined loading. Solutions for special cases exist for common structures such as thin-walled pressure vessels.

For the analysis of entire systems, this approach can be used in conjunction with statics, giving rise to the method of sections and method of joints for truss analysis, moment distribution method for small rigid frames, and portal frame and cantilever method for large rigid frames. Except for moment distribution, which came into use in the 1930s, these methods were developed in their current forms in the second half of the nineteenth century. They are still used for small structures and for preliminary design of large structures.

The solutions are based on linear isotropic infinitesimal elasticity and Euler–Bernoulli beam theory. In other words, they contain the assumptions (among others) that the materials in question are elastic, that stress is related linearly to strain, that the material (but not the structure) behaves identically regardless of direction of the applied load, that all deformations are small, and that beams are long relative to their depth. As with any simplifying assumption in engineering, the more the model strays from reality, the less useful (and more dangerous) the result.

=== Example ===
There are 2 commonly used methods to find the truss element forces, namely the method of joints and the method of sections. Below is an example that is solved using both of these methods. The first diagram below is the presented problem for which the truss element forces have to be found. The second diagram is the loading diagram and contains the reaction forces from the joints.

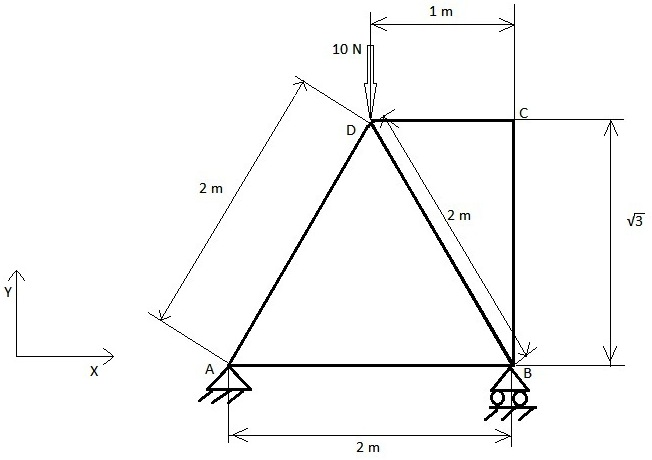
A simple triangular truss with loads imposed .

Since there is a pin joint at A, it will have 2 reaction forces. One in the x direction and the other in the y direction. At point B, there is a roller joint and hence only 1 reaction force in the y direction. Assuming these forces to be in their respective positive directions (if they are not in the positive directions, the value will be negative).

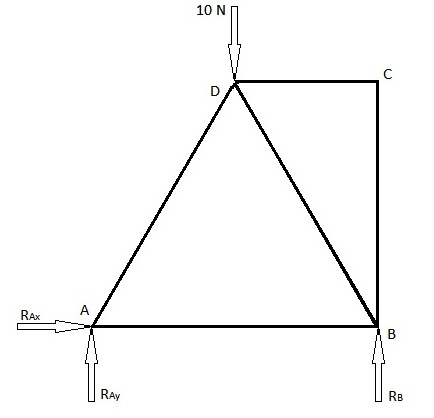

Since the system is in static equilibrium, the sum of forces in any direction is zero and the sum of moments about any point is zero. Therefore, the magnitude and direction of the reaction forces can be calculated.

$$\sum M_A=0=-10*1+2*R_B \Rightarrow R_B=5$$
$$\sum F_y=0=R_{Ay}+R_B-10 \Rightarrow R_{Ay}=5$$
$$\sum F_x=0=R_{Ax}$$

==== Method of joints ====
This type of method uses the force balance in the x and y directions at each of the joints in the truss structure.

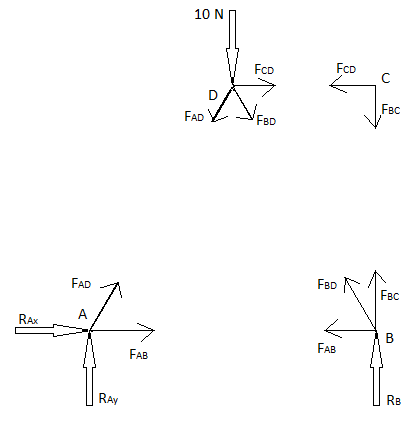

At A,

$$\sum F_y=0=R_{Ay}+F_{AD}\sin(60)=5+F_{AD}\frac{\sqrt{3} }{2} \Rightarrow F_{AD}=-\frac{10}{\sqrt{3}}$$
$$\sum F_x=0=R_{Ax}+F_{AD}\cos(60)+F_{AB}=0-\frac{10}{\sqrt{3} }\frac{1}{2}+F_{AB} \Rightarrow F_{AB}=\frac{5}{\sqrt{3}}$$

At D,

$$\sum F_y=0=-10-F_{AD}\sin(60)-F_{BD}\sin(60)=-10-\left(-\frac{10}{\sqrt{3}}\right)\frac{\sqrt{3} }{2}-F_{BD}\frac{\sqrt{3}}{2} \Rightarrow F_{BD}=-\frac{10}{\sqrt{3}}$$
$$\sum F_x=0=-F_{AD}\cos(60)+F_{BD}\cos(60)+F_{CD}=-\frac{10}{\sqrt{3}}\frac{1}{2}+\frac{10}{\sqrt{3} }\frac{1}{2}+F_{CD} \Rightarrow F_{CD}=0$$

At C,

$$\sum F_y=0=-F_{BC} \Rightarrow F_{BC}=0$$

Although the forces in each of the truss elements are found, it is a good practice to verify the results by completing the remaining force balances.

$$\sum F_x=-F_{CD}=-0=0 \Rightarrow verified$$

At B,

$$\sum F_y=R_B+F_{BD}\sin(60)+F_{BC}=5+\left(-\frac{10}{\sqrt{3}}\right)\frac{\sqrt{3} }{2}+0=0 \Rightarrow verified$$
$$\sum F_x=-F_{AB}-F_{BD}\cos(60)=\frac{5}{\sqrt{3}}-\frac{10}{\sqrt{3}}\frac{1}{2}=0 \Rightarrow verified$$

==== Method of sections ====
Ritter's method of sections can be used when the truss element forces of only a few members are to be found. This method is used by introducing a single straight line cutting through the member whose force has to be calculated. However this method has a limit in that the cutting line can pass through a maximum of only 3 members of the truss structure. This restriction is because this method uses the force balances in the x and y direction and the moment balance, which gives a maximum of 3 equations to find a maximum of 3 unknown truss element forces through which this cut is made. Find the forces FAB, FBD and FCD in the above example

===== Method 1: Ignore the right side =====
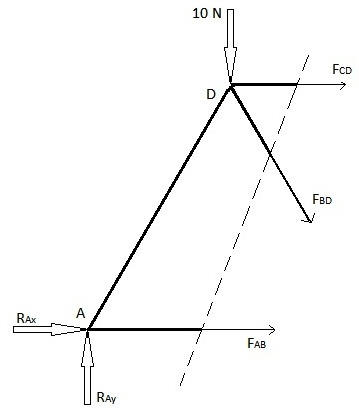
$$\sum M_D=0=-5*1+\sqrt{3}*F_{AB} \Rightarrow F_{AB}=\frac{5}{\sqrt{3} }$$
$$\sum F_y=0=R_{Ay}-F_{BD}\sin(60)-10=5-F_{BD}\frac{\sqrt{3}}{2}-10 \Rightarrow F_{BD}=-\frac{10}{\sqrt{3}}$$
$$\sum F_x=0=F_{AB}+F_{BD}\cos(60)+F_{CD}=\frac{5}{\sqrt{3}}-\frac{10}{\sqrt{3}}\frac{1}{2}+F_{CD} \Rightarrow F_{CD}=0$$

===== Method 2: Ignore the left side =====
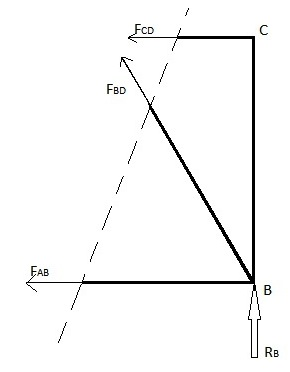
$$\sum M_B=0=\sqrt{3}*F_{CD} \Rightarrow F_{CD}=0$$
$$\sum F_y=0=F_{BD}\sin(60)+R_B=F_{BD}\frac{\sqrt{3}}{2}+5 \Rightarrow F_{BD}=-\frac{10}{\sqrt{3}}$$
$$\sum F_x=0=-F_{AB}-F_{BD}\cos(60)-F_{CD}=-F_{AB}-\left(-\frac{10}{\sqrt{3}}\right)\frac{1}{2}-0 \Rightarrow F_{AB}=\frac{5}{\sqrt{3}}$$

The truss elements forces in the remaining members can be found by using the above method with a section passing through the remaining members.

== Elasticity methods ==
Elasticity methods are available generally for an elastic solid of any shape. Individual members such as beams, columns, shafts, plates and shells may be modeled. The solutions are derived from the equations of linear elasticity. The equations of elasticity are a system of 15 partial differential equations. Due to the nature of the mathematics involved, analytical solutions may only be produced for relatively simple geometries. For complex geometries, a numerical solution method such as the finite element method is necessary.

== Methods using numerical approximation ==
It is common practice to use approximate solutions of differential equations as the basis for structural analysis. This is usually done using numerical approximation techniques. The most commonly used numerical approximation in structural analysis is the finite element method (FEM).

The finite element method approximates a structure as an assembly of elements or components with various forms of connection between them and each element of which has an associated stiffness. Thus, a continuous system such as a plate or shell is modeled as a discrete system with a finite number of elements interconnected at finite number of nodes and the overall stiffness is the result of the addition of the stiffness of the various elements. The behaviour of individual elements is characterized by the element's stiffness (or flexibility) relation. The assemblage of the various stiffness's into a master stiffness matrix that represents the entire structure leads to the system's stiffness or flexibility relation. To establish the stiffness (or flexibility) of a particular element, we can use the mechanics of materials approach for simple one-dimensional bar elements, and the elasticity approach for more complex two- and three-dimensional elements. The analytical and computational development are best effected throughout by means of matrix algebra, solving partial differential equations.

Early applications of matrix methods were applied to articulated frameworks with truss, beam and column elements; later and more advanced matrix methods, referred to as "finite element analysis", model an entire structure with one-, two-, and three-dimensional elements and can be used for articulated systems together with continuous systems such as a pressure vessel, plates, shells, and three-dimensional solids. Commercial computer software for structural analysis typically uses matrix finite-element analysis, which can be further classified into two main approaches: the displacement or stiffness method and the force or flexibility method. The stiffness method is the most popular by far thanks to its ease of implementation as well as of formulation for advanced applications. The finite-element technology is now sophisticated enough to handle just about any system as long as sufficient computing power is available. Its applicability includes, but is not limited to, linear and non-linear analysis, solid and fluid interactions, materials that are isotropic, orthotropic, or anisotropic, and external effects that are static, dynamic, and environmental factors. This, however, does not imply that the computed solution will automatically be reliable because much depends on the model and the reliability of the data input.

== Timeline ==
- 1452–1519 Leonardo da Vinci made many contributions
- 1638: Galileo Galilei published the book "Two New Sciences" in which he examined the failure of simple structures
- 1660: Hooke's law by Robert Hooke
- 1687: Isaac Newton published "Philosophiae Naturalis Principia Mathematica" which contains the Newton's laws of motion
- 1750: Euler–Bernoulli beam equation
- 1700–1782: Daniel Bernoulli introduced the principle of virtual work
- 1707–1783: Leonhard Euler developed the theory of buckling of columns
- 1826: Claude-Louis Navier published a treatise on the elastic behaviors of structures
- 1873: Carlo Alberto Castigliano presented his dissertation "Intorno ai sistemi elastici", which contains his theorem for computing displacement as partial derivative of the strain energy. This theorem includes the method of 'least work' as a special case
- 1878-1972 Stephen Timoshenko father of modern Applied mechanics including the Timoshenko–Ehrenfest beam theory
- 1936: Hardy Cross' publication of the moment distribution method which was later recognized as a form of the relaxation method applicable to the problem of flow in pipe-network
- 1941: Alexander Hrennikoff submitted his D.Sc. thesis in MIT on the discretization of plane elasticity problems using a lattice framework
- 1942: R. Courant divided a domain into finite subregions
- 1956: J. Turner, R. W. Clough, H. C. Martin, and L. J. Topp's paper on the "Stiffness and Deflection of Complex Structures" introduces the name "finite-element method" and is widely recognized as the first comprehensive treatment of the method as it is known today

== See also ==
- Geometrically and materially nonlinear analysis with imperfections included
- Limit state design
- Structural engineering theory
- Structural integrity and failure
- Stress–strain analysis
- von Mises yield criterion
- Probabilistic Assessment of Structures
- Structural testing
