= Carlos A. Felippa =

Carlos A. Felippa is a professor of Aerospace Engineering Sciences at the University of Colorado. His research at Colorado concerns aerospace structures and structural analysis, with special interests in coupled field problems: elastoacoustics, aeroelasticity, control-structure interaction, thermomechanics and electrothermomechanics.

== Biography ==
Felippa studied civil engineering at the Universidad Nacional de Córdoba (Ing. Civ. 1963) and the University of California, Berkeley (M.S. 1964 and Ph.D. 1966). After working at Boeing and Lockheed, he took a position at the University of Colorado in 1986, where from 1989 to 1991 he directed the Center for Space Structures and Controls.

== Selected publications ==
Professor Felippa has over 150 publications in refereed journals, conference proceedings, and book chapters.

- C. A. Felippa and K. C. Park, A direct flexibility method, Computer Methods in Applied Mechanics and Engineering, 149, 319–337, 1997.
- C. A. Felippa, Recent Developments in Parametrized Variational Principles for Mechanics, Computational Mechanics, 18, No. 3, 159–174, 1996.
- C. A. Felippa, L. A. Crivelli and B. Haugen, A Survey of the Core-Congruential Formulation for Nonlinear Finite Elements, Archives of Computational Methods in Engineering, 1, pp. 1–48, 1994.
- C. A. Felippa, Parametrized Variational Principles and Applications, Science and Perspectives in Mechanics, ed. by B. Nayroles, J. Etay and D. Renouard, ENS Grenoble, Grenoble, France, 1994, pp. 1–42.
- K. C. Park and C. A. Felippa, Partitioned Analysis of Coupled Systems, Chapter 3 in Computational Methods for Transient Analysis, T. Belytschko and T. J. R. Hughes, eds., North-Holland, Amsterdam–New York, 1983.
