= Marcus' method =

Marcus's method is a structural analysis used in the design of reinforced concrete slabs. The method was developed by Henri Marcus and described in 1938 in Die Theorie elastischer Gewebe und ihre Anwendung auf die Berechnung biegsamer Platten. The method adapts the strip method and is based on an elastic analysis of torsionally restrained two-way rectangular slabs with a uniformly distributed load. Marcus introduced a correction factor to the existing Rankine Grashoff theory in order to account for torsional restraints at the corners.
