= Geometrically and materially nonlinear analysis with imperfections included =

Geometrically and materially nonlinear analysis with imperfections included (GMNIA), is a structural analysis method designed to verify the strength capacity of a structure, which accounts for both plasticity and buckling failure modes.

GMNIA is currently considered the most sophisticated and perspectively the most accurate method of a numerical buckling strength verification.
