= Slip line field =

Method of analyzing stresses and strains within materials

In materials science and soil mechanics, a slip line field or slip line field theory is a technique often used to analyze the stresses and forces involved in the major deformation of metals or soils. In essence, in some problems including plane strain and plane stress elastic-plastic problems, elastic part of the material prevent unrestrained plastic flow but in many metal-forming processes, such as rolling, drawing, gorging, etc., large unrestricted plastic flows occur except for many small elastic zones. In effect we are concerned with a rigid-plastic material under condition of plane strain. it turns out that the simplest way of solving stress equations is to express them in terms of a coordinate system that is along potential slip (or failure) surfaces. It is for this reason that this type of analysis is termed slip line analysis or the theory of slip line fields in the literature.

== History ==
The slip-line theory was co-developed by Hilda Geiringer in the early 1930s. She developed the Geiringer equations, which simplify the process of calculating the deformation.
