= Alexander Hrennikoff =

Russian-Canadian structural engineer

- Russian-Canadian engineer Alexander Hrennikoff
- Born: Russia, 1896
- Died: 31 December 1984
- Education: Institute of Railway Engineering; University of British Columbia; Massachusetts Institute of Technology
- Known for: Finite element method Structural engineering
- Scientific career
- Fields: Engineering

Alexander Pavlovich Hrennikoff (Russian: Александр Павлович Хренников; 11 November 1896 — 31 December 1984) was a Russian-Canadian structural engineer, a founder of the Finite Element Method.

== Biography ==
Alexander was born in Russia, graduated from the Institute of Railway Engineering in Moscow, received M.A.Sc. degree from the University of British Columbia (1933), and D.Sc degree from the Massachusetts Institute of Technology (1941). From 1933 until his death in 1984 he worked as a professor of Civil Engineering at the University of British Columbia.

== Work ==
During his work at the Massachusetts Institute of Technology he developed the lattice analogy which models membrane and plate bending of structures as a lattice framework. While this work received little attention at the time because of the lack of computational power, it is often considered as the turning point in the Time-Line of the Structural Analysis leading to development of the Finite Element Method. He later extended the lattice models to plate and shell buckling problems, and made important contributions to the plastic design theory of metal structures.

== Bibliography ==
- A. Hrennikoff, Solution of Problems of Elasticity by the Frame-Work Method (1941). ASME J. Appl. Mech. 8, A619–A715.
- C. A. Felippa, The Amusing History of Shear Flexible Beam Elements, 2005, available online as
- J. T. Oden, Historical Comments on Finite Elements, available online as
