= John Perry (engineer) =

Irish engineer and mathematician (1850–1920)

- Born: 14 February 1850; Garvagh, County Londonderry, Ireland
- Died: 4 August 1920 (aged 70)
- Parent: Samuel Perry
- Engineering career
- Discipline: Mechanical
- Significant design: Ayrton–Perry winding

John Perry (14 February 1850 – 4 August 1920) was a pioneering engineer and mathematician from Ireland.

== Life ==
He was born on 14 February 1850 at Garvagh, County Londonderry, the second son of Samuel Perry and a Scottish-born wife. John's brother James was the County Surveyor in Galway West and co-founded the Galway Electric Light Company. One of James Perry's daughters, Alice, was one of the first women in the world with an engineering degree.

Perry worked as Lord Kelvin's assistant at the University of Glasgow, and later became professor of mechanical engineering at Finsbury Technical College. He was a colleague of William Edward Ayrton and John Milne at the Imperial College of Engineering in Tokyo, 1875–79, and was also a Fellow of the Royal Society. He was professor of mathematics at Imperial College in London from 1896 to 1913. In 1900 he was elected president of the Institution of Electrical Engineers, and from 1906 to 1908 served as president of the Physical Society of London.

Perry was a great admirer of his employer, Lord Kelvin. In the printing of his 1890 lecture on spinning tops, Perry inscribed the following acknowledgement: "This report of an experimental lecture is inscribed to William Thomson, by his affectionate pupil, the lecturer, who hereby takes a convenient method of acknowledging the real author of whatever is worth publication in the following pages." The book was later reprinted by Dover Publications in 1957 as Spinning Tops and Gyroscopic Motions. Although others (Max Schuler in Germany, Sperry in the USA) had been working on developing practical gyrocompasses, Perry collaborated with Sidney Brown to further develop these and they were awarded U.S. patent 1291695A : "Gyro-compass" by John Perry, Sidney George Brown, filed August 1917; granted 1919.

Perry received an honorary doctorate (LL.D) from the University of Glasgow in June 1901.

== Challenging Lord Kelvin ==
In 1895, Perry published a paper challenging Kelvin's assumption of low thermal conductivity inside the Earth, and thus disputing Kelvin's estimate that the Earth was only 20–400 million years old, but this had little impact. It was not until the discovery in 1903 that radioactive decay releases heat and the development a few years later of radiometric dating of rocks that it was accepted that the age of Earth was many times greater, as Perry had argued. Perry's reasoning held that if the interior of the Earth was fluid, or partly fluid, it would transfer heat much more effectively than the conductivity which Kelvin assumed, and he stated that "much internal fluidity would practically mean infinite conductivity for our purpose."

Kelvin rejected this idea as there was no evidence of tidal deformation of the Earth's crust, and in response Perry made a reference to Kelvin's favourite demonstration of the slow deformation of shoemaker's wax to illustrate the supposed qualities of the presumed luminiferous aether thought then to be necessary to transmit light through space. Perry wrote that "the real basis of your calculation is your assumption that the solid earth cannot alter its shape ... even in 1000 million years, under the action of forces constantly tending to alter its shape, and yet we see the gradual closing up of passages in a mine, and we know that wrinkling and faults and other changes of shape are always going on in the earth under the action of long-continued forces. I know that solid rock is not like cobbler's wax, but 10^{9} years is a long time, and the forces are great."

The failure of the scientific community to accept a fluid interior to the Earth held back ideas in geology until the concept was revived by proponents of continental drift, and even in the 1960s geophysical models were still being constructed on the basis that the Earth was solid.

== Theory of buckling in imperfect struts ==
Perry made significant contributions to structural mechanics, particularly to the theory of column buckling. Ayrton and Perry published On Struts (1886), in which they examined the stability of compression members with initial geometric imperfections. This work improved on the prevailing Euler buckling theory, which assumes perfectly straight columns, by showing that even small initial crookedness can substantially reduce the critical load of a strut.

Perry's theoretical work was later complemented by extensive experimental investigations by Andrew Robertson, who in 1925 tested large numbers of hot-rolled steel sections to quantify the influence of imperfections on buckling strength. Robertson derived empirical relationships linking Perry's imperfection factor to the slenderness ratio of columns. The combined theoretical and experimental results became known as the Perry–Robertson formula, which has since been incorporated into British Standards BS 449 and BS 153, as well as in the European structural codes (Eurocode), as a reliable and practical method for predicting column buckling limits.
