= Compression member =

Structural element carrying load

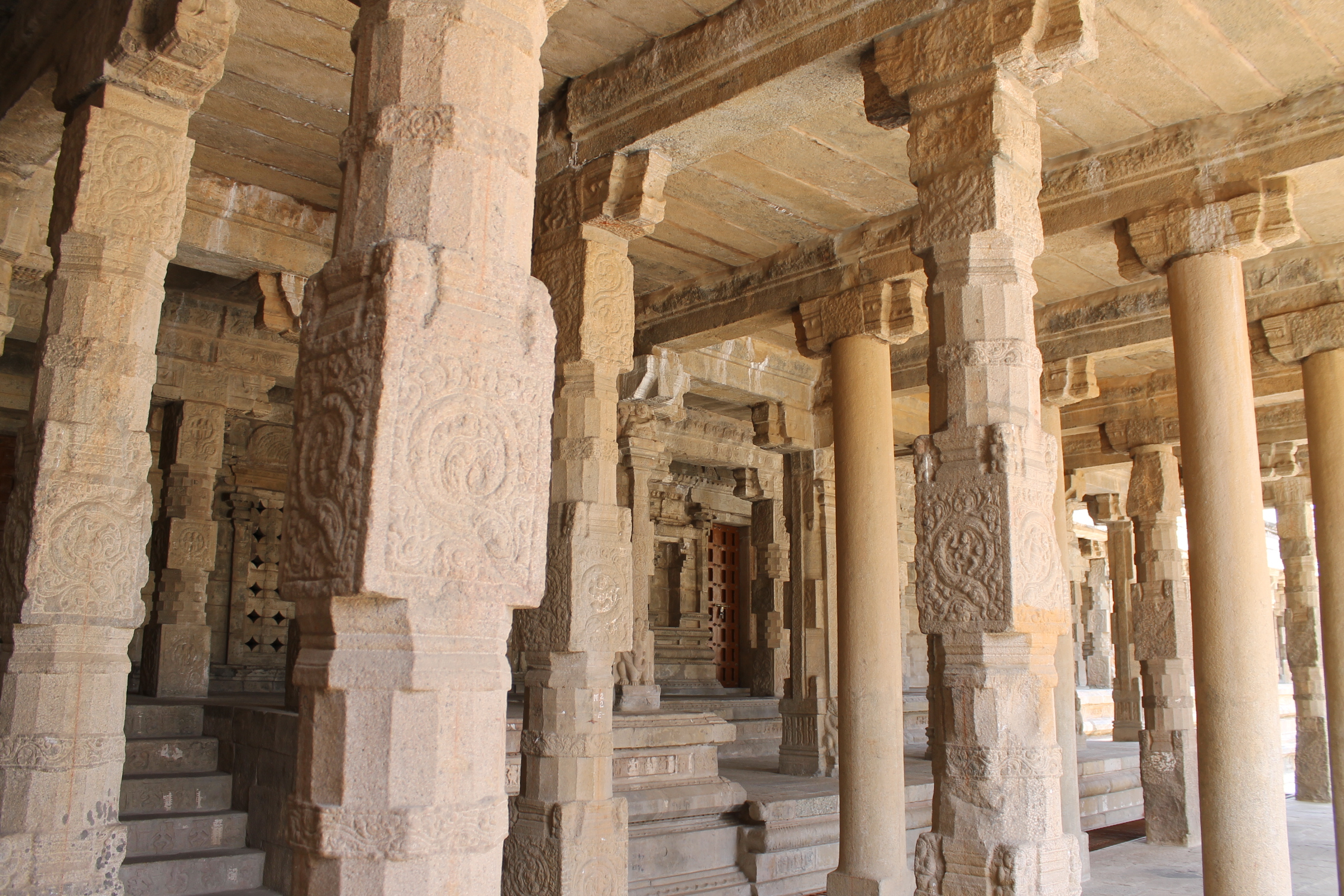
Columns at the Airavatesvara Temple, India

A compression member is a structural element that primarily resists forces, which act to shorten or compress the member along its length. Commonly found in engineering and architectural structures, such as columns, struts, and braces, compression members are designed to withstand loads that push or press on them without buckling or failing. The behavior and strength of a compression member depends on factors like material properties, cross-sectional shape, length, and the type of loading applied. These components are critical in frameworks like bridges, buildings, and towers, where they provide stability and support against vertical and lateral forces. In buildings, posts and columns are almost always compression members, as are the top chord of trusses in bridges, etc.

== Design ==
For a compression member, such as a column, the principal stress primarily arises from axial forces, which act along a single axis, typically through the centroid of the member cross section. As detailed in the article on buckling, the slenderness of a compression member, which is defined as the ratio of its effective length to its radius of gyration ($\lambda=L_{eff}/r$), has a critical role in determining its strength and behavior with axial loading:

- The load capacity of low slenderness (stocky) members is governed by their material compressive strength;
- Both material strength and buckling influence the load capacity of intermediate members; and
- The strength of slender (long) members is dominated by their buckling load.

Formulas for calculating the buckling strength of slender members were first developed by Euler, while equations like the Perry-Robertson formula are commonly applied to describe the behavior of intermediate members. The Eurocodes published by the Comité Européen de Normalisation provide guidance of the calculation of strength for compression members in concrete, masonry, steel and timber. There are other codes for steel compression members only.

== See also ==
- Arch
- Brown truss
- List of structural elements
- Strut
