= Clean and Environmentally Safe Advanced Reactor =

Nuclear reactor concept

Disputed science CAESAR reactor
- Claims: Self-sustained fissioning of uranium-238 can be accomplished via steam-moderated neutrons
- Related disciplines: Nuclear engineering; Nuclear technology; Nuclear physics
- Year proposed: 1998
- Proponents: Claudio Filippone

The Clean and Environmentally Safe Advanced Reactor (CAESAR) is a nuclear reactor concept created by Claudio Filippone, the former Director of the Center for Advanced Energy Concepts at the University of Maryland, College Park and CEO of HoloGens LLC. The concept's key element is the use of steam as a moderator, making it a type of reduced moderation water reactor. Because the density of steam may be controlled very precisely, Filippone claims it can be used to fine-tune neutron fluxes to ensure that neutrons are moving with an optimal energy profile to split ^{238}_{92}U nuclei – in other words, cause fission.

There seems to be some discrepancy between "media overview" material and technical details:

- "assembly containing only U-238 (or natural uranium, or nuclear waste) and positioned near an existing nuclear reactor acting as the "jump starter" of CAESAR."
  - this suggests that U-238 is the raw material used to breed fissile Pu-239 that is used in the core like any fast-neutron breeder reactor concept. However the neutronic (and burnup) simulation CAESAR is nowhere near other fast-breeder concepts or what is required in 2024.

The CAESAR reactor design exploits the fact that the fission products and daughter isotopes produced via nuclear reactions also decay to produce additional delayed neutrons. Filippone claims that unlike light water-cooled fission reactors, where fission occurring in enriched ^{235}U fuel rods moderated by liquid-water coolant ultimately creates a Maxwellian thermal neutron flux profile, the neutron energy profile from delayed neutrons varies widely. In a conventional reactor, he theorizes, the moderator slows these neutrons down so that they cannot contribute to the ^{238}U reaction; ^{238}U has a comparatively large cross-section for neutrons at high energies.

Filippone maintains that when steam is used as the moderator, the average neutron energy is increased from that of a liquid water-moderated reactor such that the delayed neutrons persist until they hit another nucleus. The resulting extremely high neutron economy, he claims, will make it possible to maintain a self-sustaining reaction in fuel rods of pure ^{238}U, once the reactor has been started by enriched fuel.

Skeptics , however point out that it is generally believed that a controlled, sustained chain reaction is not possible with ^{238}U. Starting in the 1930s Physicists have used the Six factor formula and its derivative Four factor formula to calculate the behavior of nuclear chain reactions inside a mass of fissile material. Based on these calculations even an infinitely large mass of pure U-238 (or even natural Uranium) is incapable of sustaining a chain reaction with only its own neutron production, so coupling the gas-cooled fast-spectrum core with a moderated outer slow-neutron section is required, or alternatively some level of fissile enrichment is required. It can undergo fission when impacted by an energetic neutron with over 1 MeV of kinetic energy. But the high-energy neutrons produced by ^{238}U fission (after quickly losing energy by inelastic scattering), are not, themselves, sufficient to induce enough successive fissions in ^{238}U to create a critical system (one in which the number of neutrons created by fission is equal to the number absorbed). Instead, bombarding ^{238}U with neutrons below the 1 MeV fission threshold causes it to absorb them without fissioning (becoming ^{239}U) and decay by beta emission to ^{239}Pu (which is itself fissile). The energy of delayed neutrons is so low that contribution to ^{238}U fission is almost 0.0000, requiring some fissile material to keep the reactor safely under prompt criticality: (e.g. ^{235}U in natural uranium and preferably also some moderator, possibly outside the extra-fast core). The maximum ratio of ^{238}U fission is limited by the neutron physics to less than 100%, but greater than 40%, which allows even a relatively low conversion ratio of 0.6 to breed its own fuel (without uranium enrichment or Pu produced elsewhere). Conversion ratio of 0.6 is achievable in practice (actually achieved even with light-water reactor designs that waste a lot of neutrons in Boron, that has better alternatives).

== See also ==
- Nuclear fission
- Nuclear reactor physics
- Nuclear power
- Nuclear power plant
- Future energy development
- Energy amplifier
- Nuclear waste
- Supercritical water reactor
