= J. B. Johnson =

J. B. Johnson may refer to:

- John Bertrand Johnson, Swedish-born American electrical engineer and physicist
- J. B. Johnson (Florida politician), American attorney and politician
- John Butler Johnson, engineer who developed Johnson's parabolic formula
