= Resonance escape probability =

Probability that a high-energy neutron is not captured

In nuclear physics, resonance escape probability $p$ is the probability that a neutron will slow down from fission energy to thermal energies without being captured by a nuclear resonance. A resonance absorption of a neutron in a nucleus does not produce nuclear fission. The probability of resonance absorption is called the resonance factor $\psi$, and the sum of the two factors is $p + \psi = 1$.

Generally, the higher the neutron energy, the lower the probability of absorption, but for some energies, called resonance energies, the resonance factor is very high. These energies depend on the properties of heavy nuclei. Resonance escape probability is highly determined by the heterogeneous geometry of a reactor, because fast neutrons resulting from fission can leave the fuel and slow to thermal energies in a moderator, skipping over resonance energies before reentering the fuel.

Resonance escape probability appears in the four factor formula and the six factor formula. To compute it, neutron transport theory is used.

== Resonant neutron absorption ==
The nucleus can capture a neutron only if the kinetic energy of the neutron is close to the energy of one of the energy levels of the new nucleus formed as a result of capture. The capture cross section of such a neutron by the nucleus increases sharply. The energy at which the neutron-nucleus interaction cross section reaches a maximum is called the resonance energy. The resonance energy range is divided into two parts, the region of resolved and unresolved resonances. The first region occupies the energy interval from 1 eV to E_{gr}. In this region, the energy resolution of the instruments is sufficient to distinguish any resonance peak. Starting from the energy E_{gr}, the distance between resonance peaks becomes smaller than the energy resolution. Subsequently, the resonance peaks are not separated. For heavy elements, the boundary energy E_{gr}≈1 keV. In thermal neutron reactors, the main resonant neutron absorber is Uranium-238. In the table for ^{238}U, several resonance neutron energies E_{r}, the maximum absorption cross sections σ_{a, r} in the peak, and the width G of these resonances are given.

Parameters of resonant peaks of ^{238}U
E_{r}, eV	σ_{a, r}, barn	G, meV
6,68	22030	26,3
21,0	33080	34,0
36,8	39820	59,0
66,3	21190	43,0

== Effective resonance integral ==
Let us assume that the resonant neutrons move in an infinite system consisting of a moderator and ^{238}U. When colliding with the moderator nuclei, the neutrons are scattered, and with the ^{238}U nuclei, they are absorbed. The former collisions favor the retention and removal of resonant neutrons from the danger zone, while the latter lead to their loss.

The probability of avoiding resonance capture (coefficient φ) is related to the density of nuclei N_{S} and the moderating power of the medium ξΣ_{S} by the relationship below,

$$\varphi = e^{- \frac {N_S}{\xi\Sigma_S}J_\mathrm{eff} }.$$

The J_{eFF} value is called the effective resonance integral. It characterizes the absorption of neutrons by a single nucleus in the resonance region and is measured in barns. The use of the effective resonance integral simplifies quantitative calculations of resonance absorption without detailed consideration of neutron interaction at deceleration. The effective resonance integral is usually determined experimentally. It depends on the concentration of ^{238}U and the mutual arrangement of uranium and the moderator.

=== Homogeneous mixtures ===
In a homogeneous mixture of moderator and ^{238}U, the effective resonance integral is found with a good accuracy by the empirical formula below,

$$\varphi = e^{- \frac {N_S}{\xi\Sigma_S}J_\mathrm{eff} }.$$

where N_{3}/_{N8} is the ratio of moderator and ^{238}U nuclei in the homogeneous mixture, σ^{3}_{S} is the microscopic scattering cross section of the moderator. As can be seen from the formula, the effective resonance integral decreases with increasing ^{238}U concentration. The more ^{238}U nuclei in the mixture, the less likely absorption by a single nucleus of the moderating neutrons will take place. The effect of absorption in some ^{238}U nuclei on absorption in others is called resonance level shielding. It increases with increasing concentration of resonance absorbers.

As an example, we can calculate the effective resonance integral in a homogeneous natural uranium-graphite mixture with the ratio N_{3}/N_{8}=215. The scattering cross section of graphite σ^{C}_{S}=4.7 barns;

$J_\mathrm{eff} = 3,9\cdot (215 \cdot 4,7)^{0,415} = 69$ барн.

== Heterogeneous mixtures ==
In a homogeneous environment, all ^{238}U nuclei are in the same conditions with respect to the resonant neutron flux. In a heterogeneous environment uranium is separated from the moderator, which significantly affects the resonant neutron absorption. Firstly, some of the resonant neutrons become thermal neutrons in the moderator without colliding with uranium nuclei; secondly, resonant neutrons hitting the surface of the fuel elements are almost all absorbed by the thin surface layer. The inner ^{238}U nuclei are shielded by the surface nuclei and participate less in the resonant neutron absorption, and the shielding increases with the increase of the fuel element diameter d. Therefore, the effective ^{238}U resonance integral in a heterogeneous reactor depends on the fuel element diameter d:

$$J_\mathrm{eff}=a+\frac {b}{\sqrt{d}}.$$

The constant a characterizes the absorption of resonance neutrons by surface and the constant b - by inner ^{238}U nuclei. For each type of nuclear fuel (natural uranium, uranium dioxide, etc.) the constants a and b are measured experimentally. For natural uranium rods a=4.15, b=12.35.

$$J_\mathrm{eff}=4,15+\frac {12,35}{\sqrt{d}},$$

U for a rod from natural uranium with diameter d=3 cm:

$J_\mathrm{eff}=4,15+\frac {12,35}{\sqrt{3}} \approx 11,3$ barns.

Comparison of the last two examples shows that the separation of uranium and moderator noticeably decreases neutron absorption in the resonance region.

== Moderator influence ==
Coefficient φ is dependent on the following;

$$\frac{N_8 J_\mathrm{eff}}{\xi\Sigma_S} = \frac{\Sigma}{\xi\Sigma_S},$$

Which reflects the competition of two processes in the resonance region: absorption of neutrons and their deceleration. The cross section Σ, by definition, is analogous to the macroscopic absorption cross section with replacement of the microscopic cross section by the effective resonance integral J_{eFF}. It also characterizes the loss of slowing neutrons in the resonance region. As the ^{238}U concentration increases, the absorption of resonant neutrons increases and hence fewer neutrons are slowed down to thermal energies. The resonance absorption is influenced by the slowing down of neutrons. Collisions with the moderator nuclei take neutrons out of the resonance region and are more intense the greater the moderating power $\xi\Sigma_S$. So, for the same concentration of ^{238}U, the probability of avoiding resonance capture in the uranium-water medium is greater than in the uranium-carbon medium.

Let us calculate the probability of avoiding resonance capture in homogeneous and heterogeneous environments natural uranium-graphite. In both media the ratio of carbon and ^{238}U nuclei N_{C}/N_{S}=215. The diameter of the uranium rod is d=3 cm. Taking into account that ξC=0.159, σ^{C}_{a}=4.7 barn, we calculate the following probability;

$\frac{N_8}{\xi\sigma^C_SN_C} = \frac{1}{0,159 \cdot 4,7 \cdot 215} = 0,00625$ barn^{−1}.

Calculating the coefficients φ in homogeneous and heterogeneous mixtures, we get;

φ_{hom} = e^{−0,00625·68} = e^{−0,425} ≈ 0,65,

φ_{het} = e^{−0,00625·11,3} = e^{−0,0705} ≈ 0,93.

The transition from homogeneous to heterogeneous medium slightly reduces the thermal neutron absorption in uranium. However, this loss is considerably overlapped by the decrease of the resonance neutron absorption, and the propagation properties of the medium improve.

== Literature ==
- Dorf, Richard, ed. (2018). The Engineering Handbook (2nd ed.). Boca Raton: CRC. pp. 70–76. ISBN 9781420039870.
