= Rail stressing =

Engineering process

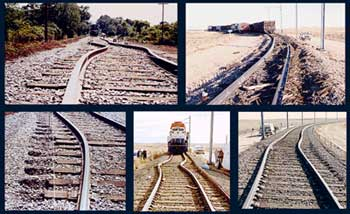
Buckled CWR track

Stressing is a rail engineering process. It is used to prevent heat and cold tension after installation of continuous welded rail (CWR). Environmental heat causes CWR to expand and therefore can cause the fixed track to buckle. Environmental cold can lead to the contraction of the fixed railway track causing brittleness and cracks. Before it is installed, the rail is altered by stretching with hydraulic tensors or heated to its stress-free temperature to make these dangerous problems less likely.

== Background ==
Railway steel contracts at low temperatures and expands at high temperatures. In extreme cold, a length of CWR suffers tensile stress. This stress can cause railway steel to fracture. In extreme heat, a length of CWR suffers compressive stress. This type of stress can cause sun kink where a length of a railway buckles laterally (sideways). Other factors that affect CWR condition include the state of the track ballast and its shoulders; the type and placement of the sleepers; places of increased shadow such as tunnels and bridges; track consolidation; and, to a lesser degree, the vertical curvature of the tracks.

In the design and installation of CWR, a figure known as the "rail neutral temperature" (RNT) is calculated. The tensile and compressive longitudinal forces on the CWR are added. The RNT is the notional temperature when the total equals zero. A similar figure is the "stress free temperature" (SFT). It is the rail temperature at which the rail is the same length as in its unrestrained state.

== Engineering solutions ==
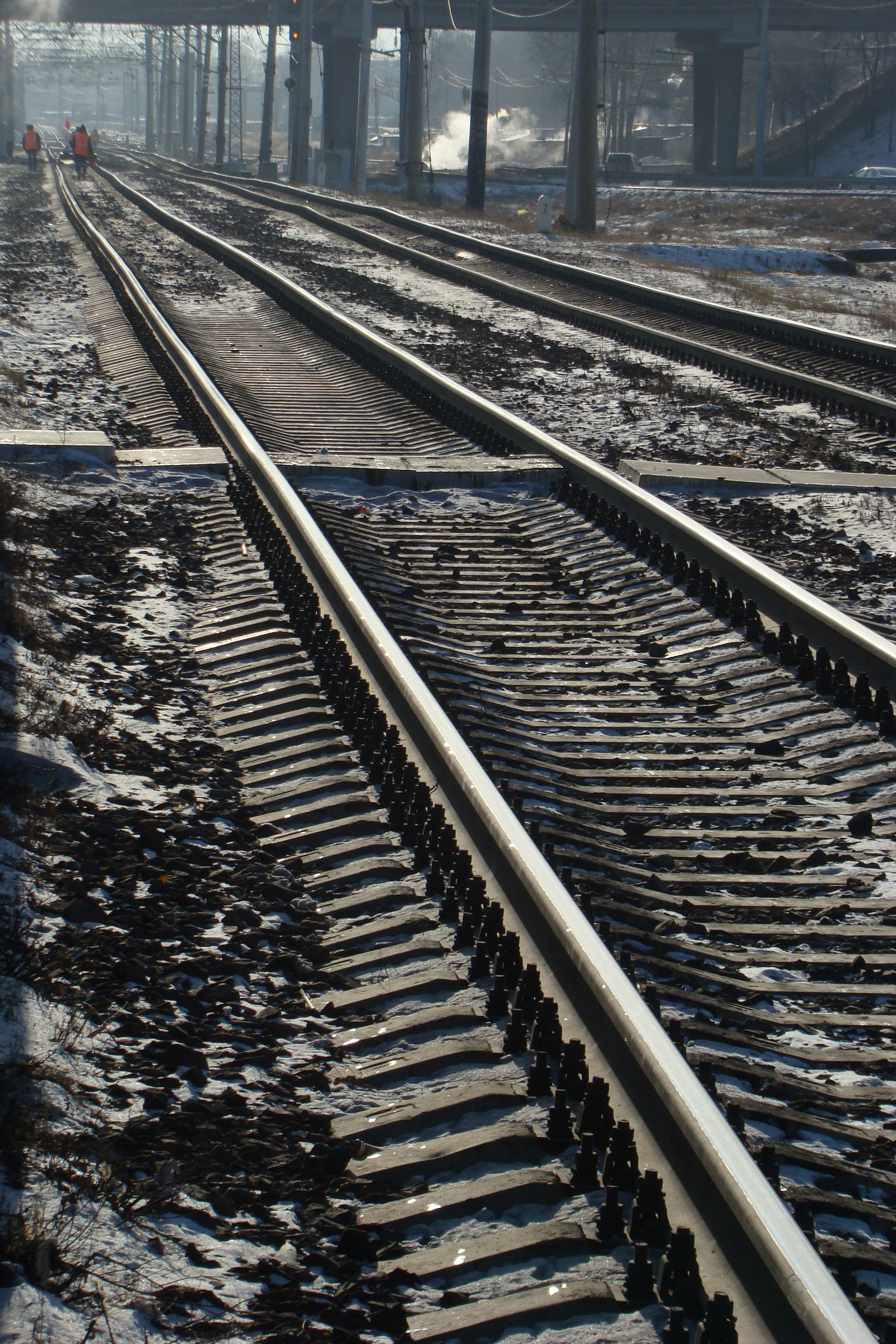
Continuous welded rail track

Before laying new track, repairing track, or changing the sleepers, the rail is mechanically or thermally altered (stressed) so that its length equals the same at a chosen stress-free temperature; the rail can then be fixed in place with no thermal forces in effect. The stress-free temperature that is used is dependent on environmental extremes and thus varies with location. In the United Kingdom, CWR is stressed to 27 °C (81 °F), the mean summer rail temperature. In the US, standard stress free temperatures vary from 35 to 43 °C (95 to 109 °F). Despite stressing the CWR before installation, a rail may still reach its "Critical Rail Temperature" (CRT). This is the temperature of the rail above which buckling may occur.

The CRT may be reached due to disturbance of the ballast, track components or track geometry. For example, the CRT may be reached due to a removal of a rail section or an Insulated Block Joint (IBJ). A stressing engineer measures the rail section to be removed and places indicators with marks on the foot of the rails. After the rail section is cut out, its first stress free temperature is determined. The new rail section is cut and replaced and then welded at one end. A "stressing kit" (hydraulic rail tensor), such as the Permaquip HSM70 Stressor, or other method is used to adjust the other end and make the join ready for welding. If a section of rail must be replaced urgently, a stress check is performed later on.

== See also ==
- Breather switch, an expansion joint for long rail sections
