= Wood method =

Method in structural analysis of buckling

The Wood method, also known as the Merchant–Rankine–Wood method, is a structural analysis method which was developed to determine estimates for the effective buckling length of a compressed member included in a building frames, both in sway and a non-sway buckling modes. It is named after R. H. Wood.

According to this method, the ratio between the critical buckling length and the real length of a column is determined based on two redistribution coefficients, $\eta_1$ and $\eta_2$, which are mapped to a ratio between the effective buckling length of a compressed member and its real length.

The redistribution coefficients are obtained through the following expressions:

$$\eta_i = \frac{K_c + K_i}{K_c+K_i + K_i1 + K_i2},\quad i = 1,2$$

where $K_i$ are the stiffness coefficients for the adjacent length of columns.

Although this method was included in ENV 1993-1-1:1992, it is absent from EN 1993-1-1.

== See also ==
- EN 1993
- Merchant–Rankine method
- Horne method
