= Reduced moderation water reactor =

Type of nuclear power reactor

The Reduced-Moderation Water Reactor (RMWR), also referred to as the Resource-renewable BWR, is a proposed type of light water-moderated nuclear power reactor, featuring some characteristics of a fast neutron reactor, thereby combining the established and proven technology of light water reactors with the desired features of fast neutron reactors. The RMWR concept builds upon the Advanced Boiling Water Reactor and is under active development in theoretical studies, particularly in Japan. Hitachi and the Japan Atomic Energy Agency are both involved in research.

Even in Generation II PWRs, the neutron spectrum is not fully thermalised. The goal of the RMWR is to depart further from the thermal neutron spectrum in order to achieve a breeder ratio of slightly greater than one, so that after the initial fuel charge no enrichment of the uranium input to the fuel cycle is required. The RMWR concept is dependent on nuclear fuel reprocessing in order to achieve its objective of a resource renewable fuel cycle. Hitachi has proposed the FLUOREX process as reprocessing technology for this purpose, instead of the more conventional Purex technology.

In contrast to regular light water reactors and in order to achieve a harder neutron spectrum, which is optimal for breeding purposes, the RMWR uses hexagonal fuel assemblies and Y-shaped control rods. The fuel is MOX (Mixed Oxide), consisting of 18% plutonium, which is surrounded by depleted uranium in the blanket region.

Another RMWR breeder design intends on closing the nuclear fuel cycle by mixing thorium with reprocessed transuranics, which include plutonium, in a thorium-containing MOX fuel. The neutron speed would be in the spectrum that could purportedly transmutate the long-lived fission products like Tc-99 & I-127 and as the neutron spectrum is hard/fast enough, to also be capable of burning the usually troublesome minor actinides quite efficiently.

Hitachi announced a collaboration with three U.S. universities on the development of the RBWR/RMWR in 2014.

== See also ==
- Supercritical water reactor, a similar and perhaps even overlapping concept.
- Clean And Environmentally Safe Advanced Reactor, preliminary work in the 1990s.
