= Six factor formula =

Formula used to calculate nuclear chain reaction growth rate

The six-factor formula is used in nuclear engineering to determine the multiplication of a nuclear chain reaction in a finite reactor. It expresses the effective multiplication factor k as the product of the four factor formula for an infinite medium and two probabilities that a neutron is not lost to leakage, one for the fast neutrons while they slow down and one for the neutrons after they have reached thermal energies.

The formula is:

$$k = \eta f p \varepsilon P_{FNL} P_{TNL} = k_{\infty} P_{FNL} P_{TNL}$$

The six factors
| Symbol | Name | Meaning | Formula | Typical thermal reactor value |
|---|---|---|---|---|
| $\eta$ | Reproduction factor, also called the thermal fission factor | (fast neutrons produced by thermal fission)/(thermal neutrons absorbed in the fuel) | $\eta = \frac{\nu \sigma_f^F}{\sigma_a^F} = \frac{\nu \Sigma_f^F}{\Sigma_a^F}$ | 1.65 |
| $f$ | Thermal utilization factor | (thermal neutrons absorbed in the fuel)/(thermal neutrons absorbed anywhere in the core) | $f = \frac{\Sigma_a^F}{\Sigma_a}$ | 0.71 |
| $p$ | Resonance escape probability | (fission neutrons that reach thermal energies without being absorbed)/(fast neutrons that begin to slow down) | $p \approx \mathrm{exp} \left( -\frac{\sum\limits_{i=1}^{N} N_i I_{r,A,i}}{\left( \overline{\xi} \Sigma_p \right)_{mod}} \right)$ | 0.87 |
| $\varepsilon$ | Fast fission factor | (fission neutrons produced by fast and thermal fission)/(fission neutrons produced by thermal fission) | $\varepsilon = 1 + \frac{\int_F \nu \Sigma_f^f(E) \varphi_f(E) \, dE}{\int_T \nu \Sigma_f^f(E) \varphi_f(E) \, dE}$ | 1.02 |
| $P_{FNL}$ | Fast non-leakage probability | (fast neutrons that do not leak out of the reactor)/(fast neutrons produced by all fissions) | $P_{FNL} \approx \mathrm{exp} \left( -{B_g}^2 \tau_{th} \right)$ | 0.97 |
| $P_{TNL}$ | Thermal non-leakage probability | (thermal neutrons that do not leak out of the reactor)/(neutrons that reach thermal energies) | $P_{TNL} \approx \frac{1}{1+{L_{th}}^2 {B_g}^2}$ | 0.99 |

The values in the table are typical of a thermal reactor, but were adjusted in the source so that the six factors multiply to k = 1.

The symbols are defined as:

- $\nu$, $\nu_f$ and $\nu_t$ are the average number of neutrons produced per fission in the medium (2.43 for uranium-235).
- $\sigma_f^F$ and $\sigma_a^F$ are the microscopic fission and absorption cross sections for fuel, respectively.
- $\Sigma_a^F$ and $\Sigma_a$ are the macroscopic absorption cross sections in fuel and in total, respectively.
- $\Sigma_f^F$ is the macroscopic fission cross-section.
- $N_i$ is the number density of atoms of a specific nuclide.
- $I_{r,A,i}$ is the resonance integral for absorption of a specific nuclide.
  - $I_{r,A,i} = \int_{E_{th}}^{E_0} dE' \frac{\Sigma_p^{mod}}{\Sigma_t(E')} \frac{\sigma_a^i(E')}{E'}$
- $\overline{\xi}$ is the average lethargy gain per scattering event.
  - Lethargy is a measure of how far a neutron has slowed down; it is defined as $u = \ln(E_0/E)$, where $E_0$ is a reference energy, and increases as the energy of the neutron decreases.
- $u_f$ (fast utilization) is the probability that a fast neutron is absorbed in fuel.
- $P_{FAF}$ is the probability that a fast neutron absorption in fuel causes fission.
- $P_{TAF}$ is the probability that a thermal neutron absorption in fuel causes fission.
- $\varphi_f(E)$ is the spatially averaged neutron flux in the fuel and $\Sigma_f^f(E)$ is the macroscopic fission cross section in the fuel.
- In the fast fission factor, $F$ and $T$ denote the fast and thermal energy ranges, and the superscript $f$ in $\Sigma_f^f(E)$ denotes the fuel.
- In terms of the other factors, $\varepsilon \approx 1 + \frac{1-p}{p}\frac{u_f \nu_f P_{FAF}}{f \nu_t P_{TAF} P_{TNL}}$.
- ${B_g}^2$ is the geometric buckling.
- ${L_{th}}^2$ is the diffusion length of thermal neutrons.
  - ${L_{th}}^2 = \frac{D}{\Sigma_{a,th}},$ where $D$ is the diffusion coefficient.
- $\tau_{th}$ is the age to thermal.
  - In an infinite medium, $\tau_{th} = \int_{E_{th}}^{E_0} \frac{D(E) dE}{\overline{\xi} \Sigma_s(E) E}$, where $\Sigma_s$ is the macroscopic scattering cross section.
  - In a finite reactor, an approximate leakage-corrected form is $\tau = \int_{E_{th}}^{E'} dE'' \frac{1}{E''} \frac{D(E'')}{\overline{\xi} \left[ D(E'') {B_g}^2 + \Sigma_t(E') \right]}$, where $\tau_{th}$ is the value of $\tau$ at the birth energy $E'$ of the neutron.

== Neutron life cycle ==
Each factor is the ratio between the numbers of neutrons present at two successive stages of a generation, so the product of the six factors gives the ratio of the neutron populations of two successive generations. A generation can be followed by starting with 1000 neutrons and applying the factors in order. Fast fission raises the number by 4% ($\varepsilon = 1.04$) to 1040. Of these, 140 leak out of the core before they slow down, leaving 900 ($P_{FNL} = 0.865$). Another 180 are captured in resonances on the way down, leaving 720 thermal neutrons ($p = 0.80$). A further 100 leak as thermal neutrons, leaving 620 ($P_{TNL} = 0.861$). Of these, 125 are absorbed by the moderator, the structure and the control material, so 495 are absorbed in the fuel ($f = 0.799$). The resulting fissions release 1000 new fission neutrons ($\eta = 2.02$), which is the number the generation started with, so the reactor is critical.

== Multiplication and the four-factor formula ==
The multiplication factor, k, is defined as the ratio of the number of neutrons in one generation to the number of neutrons in the preceding generation (see nuclear chain reaction):

k = (number of neutrons in one generation)/(number of neutrons in preceding generation)

- If k is greater than 1, the chain reaction is supercritical, and the neutron population grows from one generation to the next.
- If k is less than 1, the chain reaction is subcritical, and the neutron population decreases from one generation to the next.
- If k = 1, the chain reaction is critical and the neutron population remains constant.

The first four factors form the four-factor formula for the infinite multiplication factor of a lattice in which no neutron can leak out:

$$k_{\infty} = \eta f p \varepsilon.$$

Because leakage removes neutrons, the effective multiplication factor of a finite core is always smaller than k_{∞}, so a reactor can only be critical if k_{∞} > 1. The product P_{FNL}P_{TNL} is the total non-leakage probability, and the total probability that a neutron leaks out of the core is one minus that product. The four-factor formula is customarily credited to Enrico Fermi, who derived it while leading the team that built Chicago Pile-1, and the six-factor formula extends it with the two leakage factors.

In the Fermi age approximation, the two leakage factors are written as the exponential and rational expressions given in the table, and the six-factor formula becomes

$$k \approx \frac{k_\infty \mathrm{exp} \left( -B_g^2 \tau_{th} \right)}{1 + B_g^2 L_{th}^2} \approx \frac{k_\infty}{1 + B_g^2 M^2}$$

where $M^2 = L_{th}^2 + \tau_{th}$ is the migration area. Setting k = 1 in this expression gives the critical size of a bare core of a given composition, or the critical composition for a given size.

== Use and limitations ==
The formula is valued less as a calculational tool than as a way of seeing how the individual processes of the neutron life cycle combine. Since η and ε are largely fixed by the choice of fuel, the designer can vary f and p by changing the ratio of fuel to moderator, and the two leakage probabilities by changing the size of the core or by surrounding it with a neutron reflector. In a large thermal reactor leakage is a small loss, of the order of 3% of the neutrons. Control rods and other strong absorbers act on the thermal utilization factor, since they compete with the fuel for thermal neutrons. Because f and p move in opposite directions as the fuel-to-moderator ratio changes, their product has an optimum. Thermal reactors are usually designed slightly undermoderated rather than overmoderated, which is the safer of the two choices to operate.

Two limitations are usually noted. The factors are not truly independent conditional probabilities, and in practice the critical condition is found with iterative numerical methods rather than by evaluating the six factors separately. The six-factor description also does not apply to a fast reactor, which contains very few thermal neutrons and has no thermal neutron life cycle of the kind the formula describes.

== See also ==
- Critical mass
- Nuclear chain reaction
- Nuclear reactor
- Four factor formula
- Neutron economy
