= Supercritical water reactor =

Concept nuclear reactor whose water operates at supercritical pressure

Supercritical water reactor scheme.

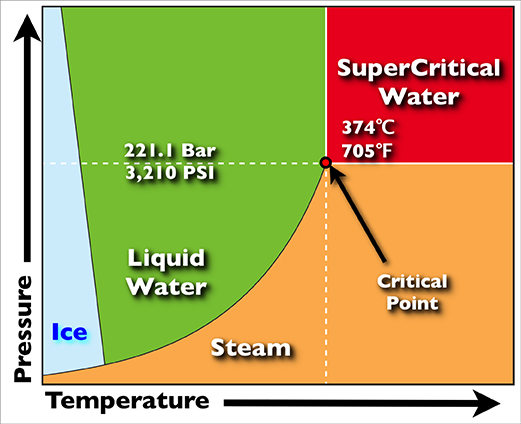
Supercritical water occurs when both temperature and pressure are very high.

The supercritical water reactor (SCWR) is a concept Generation IV reactor, designed as a light water reactor (LWR) that operates at supercritical pressure (i.e. greater than 22.1 megapascals [3,210 psi]). The term critical in this context refers to the critical point of water, and should not be confused with the concept of criticality of the nuclear reaction.

The water heated in the reactor core becomes a supercritical fluid above the critical temperature of 374 °C (705 °F), transitioning from a fluid more resembling liquid water to a fluid more resembling saturated steam (which can be used in a steam turbine), without going through the distinct phase transition of boiling.

The supercritical water reactor combines the established technologies of the supercritical steam generator (typically used to generate electricity from fossil fuels) with the boiling water reactor (BWR), to achieve a design that is simpler and more efficient than a BWR, by operating at a higher pressure. As with a BWR, the turbine and reactor pressure vessel are in the same coolant loop, in contrast to a pressurized water reactor (PWR).

Most SCWR plants are developed for power generation higher than 1000 MWe at operating pressures of about 25 MPa and reactor outlet temperatures ranging from 500 to 625 °C.

The development of SCWR systems is considered a promising advancement for nuclear power plants because of its high thermal efficiency (~45 % vs. ~33 % for current LWRs) and simpler design. As of 2012 the concept was being investigated by 32 organizations in 13 countries.

== History ==
The super-heated steam cooled reactors operating at subcritical-pressure were experimented with in both Soviet Union and in the United States as early as the 1950s and 1960s such as Beloyarsk Nuclear Power Station, Pathfinder and Bonus of GE's Operation Sunrise program. These are not SCWRs. SCWRs were developed from the 1990s onwards. Both a LWR-type SCWR with a reactor pressure vessel and a CANDU-type SCWR with pressure tubes are being developed.

A 2010 book includes conceptual design and analysis methods such as core design, plant system, plant dynamics and control, plant startup and stability, safety, fast reactor design etc.

A 2013 document saw the completion of a prototypical fueled loop test in 2015. A Fuel Qualification Test was completed in 2014.

A 2014 book saw reactor conceptual design of a thermal spectrum reactor (Super LWR) and a fast reactor (Super FR) and experimental results of thermal hydraulics, materials and material-coolant interactions.

More recently, the ECC-SMART Project has applied the SCWR concept toward supercritical water-cooled small modular reactors (SCW-SMRs). These designs aim to retain the high thermal efficiency of supercritical-water systems while reducing core size and incorporating passive residual-heat removal by natural circulation. The passive systems in SCW-SMRs are beneficial as they do not rely on active power, reducing the risk of accidents and making the management of decay heat during decommissioning easier. This research has also emphasized fuel qualification, water chemistry, and materials as key constraints on deployment.

== Design ==
=== Moderator-coolant ===
The SCWR operates at supercritical pressure. The reactor outlet coolant is supercritical water. Light water is used as a neutron moderator and coolant. Above the critical point, steam and liquid become the same density and are indistinguishable, eliminating the need for pressurizers and steam generators (PWR), or jet/recirculation pumps, steam separators and dryers (BWR). Also, by avoiding boiling, SCWR does not generate chaotic voids (bubbles) with less density and moderating effect. In a LWR this can affect heat transfer and water flow, and the feedback can make the reactor power harder to predict and control. Neutronic and thermal hydraulic coupled calculation is needed to predict the power distribution. SCWR's simplification should reduce construction costs and improve reliability and safety.

Since the supercritical water serves as both coolant and moderator in thermal spectrum LWR designs, moderation is less effective due to the much lower density. This means the macroscopic slowing down power (MSDP), is lower compared to a conventional PWR or BWR. LWR designs have addressed this by adding thermally insulated rods carrying water at lower pressure and temperature. Heavy water designs such as the Canadian SCWR concept utilise a separate, low-pressure heavy water moderator in a calandria vessel, essentially decoupling the moderator from the coolant. Thus, because moderation is a separate system, it is not affected in a loss of coolant accident (LOCA). A fast LWR-type SCWR would have a higher efficiency and power density, but needs mixed oxides fuel (MOX) which is obtained from nuclear fuel reprocessing.

=== Control ===
SCWRs would likely have control rods inserted through the top, as is done in PWRs and in contrast to BWRs, which have control rods inserted at the bottom.

=== Material ===
The temperature inside an SCWR is higher than those in LWRs. Although supercritical fossil fuel plants have much experience in the materials, it does not include the combination of high temperature environment and intense neutron radiation. SCWRs need core materials (especially fuel cladding) to resist the environment. R&D focuses on:

- The chemistry of supercritical water under radiation (preventing stress corrosion cracking, and maintaining corrosion resistance under neutron radiation and high temperatures)
- Dimensional and microstructural stability (preventing embrittlement, retaining strength and creep resistance also under radiation and high temperatures)
- Achieving the above without absorbing too many neutrons, which affects fuel economy

In the once-through coolant cycles, such as SCWRs and supercritical fossil fired power plants, the entire reactor coolant is processed at low temperature after condensation. It is an advantage in managing water chemistry and stress corrosion cracking of structural materials. It is not possible in LWRs due to the recirculation of hot reactor coolant. Materials and water chemistry R&D should be done with the once-through characteristics in mind.

== Advantages ==
- Supercritical water has excellent heat transfer properties allowing a high-power density, a small core, and a small containment structure.
- The use of a supercritical Rankine cycle with its typically higher temperatures improves efficiency (would be ~45 % versus ~33 % of current PWR/BWRs).
- This higher efficiency would lead to better fuel economy and a lighter fuel load, lessening residual (decay) heat.
- SCWR is typically designed as a direct cycle, whereby steam or hot supercritical water from the core is used directly in a steam turbine. This makes the design simple. As a BWR is simpler than a PWR, a SCWR is much simpler and more compact than a less-efficient BWR having the same electrical output. There are no steam separators, steam dryers, internal recirculation pumps, or recirculation flow inside the pressure vessel. The design is a once-through, direct-cycle, the simplest type of cycle possible. The stored thermal and radiologic energy in the smaller core and its (primary) cooling circuit would also be less than that of either a BWR's or a PWR's.
- Water is liquid at room temperature, cheap, non-toxic and transparent, simplifying inspection and repair (compared to liquid metal cooled reactors).
- A fast SCWR could be a breeder reactor, like the proposed Clean and Environmentally Safe Advanced Reactor and could burn the long-lived actinide isotopes.
- A heavy-water SCWR could breed fuel from thorium (4x more abundant than uranium). Similar to a CANDU it could also use unenriched natural uranium if enough moderation is provided
- Process heat can be delivered at higher temperatures than other water-cooled reactors allow

== Disadvantages ==
- Lower water inventory (due to compact primary loop) means less heat capacity to buffer transients and accidents (e.g., loss of feedwater flow or large break loss-of-coolant accident) resulting in accident and transient temperatures that are too high for conventional metallic cladding.

However, it is not too high for stainless steel cladding. Safety analysis of LWR type SCWR showed that safety criteria are met with margins at accidents and abnormal transients including total loss of flow and loss of coolant accident. No double ended break occurs because of the once-through coolant cycle. Core is cooled by the induced flow at the loss of coolant accident. The water inventory in the top dome of the reactor vessel serves as an in-vessel accumulator. The SCWR safety principle is not to maintain coolant inventory, but to maintain core coolant flow rate. It is easier to monitor than water level at accidents. There was an error in the water level signal in the Three Mile Island accident and the operators shut down the ECCS.

- Higher pressure combined with higher temperature and also a higher temperature rises across the core (compared to PWR/BWRs) result in increased mechanical and thermal stresses on vessel materials that are difficult to solve.

However, a LWR type design, reactor pressure vessel inner wall is cooled by the inlet coolant as PWR. Outlet coolant nozzles are equipped with thermal sleeves. A pressure-tube design, where the core is divided up into smaller tubes for each fuel channel, has potentially fewer issues here, as smaller diameter tubing can be much thinner than massive single pressure vessels, and the tube can be insulated on the inside with inert ceramic insulation so it can operate at low (calandria water) temperature.

- The coolant greatly reduces its density at the end of the core, resulting in a need to place extra moderator there.

However, a LWR type SCWR design adopts water rods in the fuel assemblies as BWRs. The coolant density in water rods is kept high with thin thermal insulation, not fully insulated. Most designs of CANDU type SCWR use an internal calandria where part of the feedwater flow is guided through top tubes through the core, that provide the added moderation (feedwater) in that region. This has the added advantage of being able to cool the entire vessel wall with feedwater, but results in a complex and materially demanding (high temperature, high temperature differences, high radiation) internal calandria and plena arrangement. A pressure-tube design has the characteristics as most of the moderator is in the calandria at low temperature and pressure, reducing the coolant density effect on moderation, and the actual pressure tube can be kept cool by the calandria water.

- Extensive material development and research on supercritical water chemistry under radiation is needed.

However, the entire SCWR coolant is cleaned after condensation. This is an advantage in managing water chemistry and Stress corrosion cracking of structural materials. It is not possible in LWRs where hot coolant circulates.

- Special start-up procedures needed to avoid instability before the water reaches supercritical conditions.

However, Instability is managed by power to coolant flow rate ratio as a BWR. The coolant density change is smaller in SCWRs than BWRs.

- A fast SCWR needs a relatively complex reactor core to have a negative void coefficient.

However, single coolant flow pass core is feasible.

- As with all alternatives to currently widespread designs (mostly subcritical water cooled, water moderated thermal reactors of some kind) there will be fewer suppliers of technology and parts and less expertise at least initially than for decades old proven technology or its evolutionary improvements such as generation III+ reactors.

However, LWRs were developed in the 1950s based on the subcritical fossil fired power technologies. The success of LWRs is based on that experience. Supercritical fossil fired power plants were developed after 1950s. Components such as valves, piping, turbines, feedwater pumps and heaters for operation at turbine throttle pressure up to 30 MPa (4,400 psi) and temperature up to 630 °C (903 K; 1,166 °F) are present for commercial applications. SCWRs are natural evolution of LWRs. The competitiveness of LWRs in the electricity market is being challenged in the US due to Shale gas from historical summaries of U.S. Energy Information Administration’s (EIA’s) Levelized cost of electricity (LCOE) projections (2010-2020) in Cost of electricity by source. LWRs are the dominant design with the largest share of nuclear power generation and are the current offering for new construction in the world. Innovation dynamics show that innovation does not come from companies with the largest market share. Comparing SCWRs and LWRs is not relevant in terms of innovation dynamics. If Small modular reactor (SMR) is competitive, a SMR version of SCWRs will increase its advantage.

- The chemical shim might behave drastically different as the solution properties of supercritical water are vastly different from those of liquid water. Currently most pressurized water reactors employ boric acid to control reactivity early in burnup.

However, chemical shim cannot be used in SCWRs as well as BWRs, due to the positive coolant void coefficient. SCWRs use borated water as the secondary shut-down similar to BWRs.

- Depending on design online refuelling may be impossible. While CANDUs are capable of online refuelling, other water moderated reactors are not.

However, the Capacity factor of LWRs is already high in USA, over 90%. Pressure vessel type SCWRs do not require online refuelling.

== See also ==
- Generation IV reactor
- Breeder reactor
- Reduced moderation water reactor, a concept that is in some ways similar and in others overlapping to the SCWR concept, and is under development apart from the Generation IV program.
- Generation III reactor
  - Advanced Boiling Water Reactor (ABWR)
  - Economic Simplified Boiling Water Reactor (ESBWR) (generation III+)
