= Stiffening =

Method of increasing rigidity and structural integrity of materials or objects

Stiffening is any process that increases the rigidity and structural integrity of objects. Stiffening is used in crafts, art, industry, architecture, sports, aerospace, object construction, bookbinding, etc.

== Mechanics ==
In mechanics, "stiffening" beams brings anti-buckling, anti-wrinkling, desired shaping, reinforcement, repair, strength, enhanced function, extended utility, longer beam life, safety, etc. Stiffening of fluid or rigid beams is used in medical arts, aerospace, aviation, sports, bookbinding, art, architecture, natural plants and trees, construction industry, bridge building, and more. Mechanical methods for stiffening include tension stiffening, centrifugal stiffening, bracing, superstructure bracing, substructure bracing, straightening, strain stiffening, stress stiffening, damping vibrations, swelling, pressure increasing, drying, cooling, interior reinforcing, exterior reinforcing, wrapping, surface treating, or combinations of these and other methods. Beams under bending loads or compression invite stiffening to stop buckling or collapse while fulfilling desired functions, purposes, and benefits.

== Bookbinding ==
In bookbinding, stiffening is a process whereby paperback books are reinforced for use in libraries, without change to their fundamental binding structure. It is in use at several academic libraries in the United States, including those at Cornell University and Johns Hopkins University.

During the stiffening process, a cloth or Tyvek strip is glued down on the inside joints of a paperback to reinforce the attachment of the book's covers. A thin but stiff board is then glued to the inside of both the front and back cover of the book, and the entire book is trimmed slightly on the head, tail, and fore edge, often with an electric guillotine.

Stiffening provides an in-house, inexpensive alternative to commercial library binding for paperbacks. While it does not involve (re-)sewing a book as in a library binding, stiffening does significantly prolong the usable life of a paperback, and allows paperbacks to stand upright on library shelves. The stiffening process was invented in 1974 by John Dean, who was Head of Preservation at Johns Hopkins at the time.

== Citations ==
- Dean, John. "The In-House Processing of Paperbacks and Pamphlets". Cornell University. Archived from the original on 2007-06-07.
- "Stiffening". The Johns Hopkins University. Archived from the original on 2006-09-03.
