= S G Brown Ltd =

S. G. Brown Ltd was established in 1903 by British engineer Sidney George Brown, to manufacture scientific instruments,

It began to make one of it its best known products, the gyroscopic compass, during World War I. Previously, these had been imported from Germany. The company also supplied thousands of its 'Type A' headphones during World War I.

From the advent of radio broadcasting, the company made headphones, radios, amplifying devices and loudspeakers for the domestic market.

When World War II started, in order to increase the company's productive capacity, the Admiralty financed an extension to the factory which the company ran on the Admiralty's behalf. By 1940, relations between the company and the Admiralty had become strained. The reason for the deterioration in the relations between the company and the Admiralty was a conflict over war-time priorities and the unwillingness of the company to carry out the Admiralty's wishes. At the end of the war, the Labour Government retained control because of the importance of gyroscopic instruments in the development of postwar defence programmes.

In 1948, the firm moved from its premises in Acton to Watford. There was also a factory in Dukes Lane, Chiswick, London W4. A joint venture gyroscope was developed with the Arma division of the Bosch Arma Corporation. The gyroscope or some of its components were made at the Chiswick factory. In 1960 the company was sold to the De Havilland division of Hawker Siddeley.

S G Brown was later owned by Vosper Thornycroft which merged it with another of its companies, TSS (motion sensor and subsea pipe/cable tracker specialist) in April 2000 to develop underwater gyros, the company now selling all products under the name VT TSS International.

Following a management buyout from the VT group and several subsequent years trading as 'TSS International', TSS were purchased by the Teledyne group in 2008 and now trade as Teledyne TSS International. Some products, principally gyrocompass and hand-steering units for military vessels, continue to be sold under the SG Brown banner.
