= Sidney Brown (electrical engineer) =

British electrical engineer and inventor

Sidney Brown

Sidney George Brown FRS (6 July 1873 – 7 August 1948) was a British electrical engineer and inventor. He is best remembered for his pioneering work on the design of gyro compasses, radio equipment and loudspeakers.

== Early life ==
Brown was born in Chicago, the son of English parents. In 1879 his family returned to the UK and Brown began his education at a private school in Parkstone, Poole, followed by Harrogate College. From 1894 to 1896 he studied at University College London, and from 1892 to 1897 was a paying pupil at Crompton & Co. at Chelmsford. After leaving Crompton & Co, Brown returned to the Bournemouth area and in 1899 filed the first of his many patents.

== Career ==
In 1906 Brown formed the Telegraph Condenser Company (TCC), a manufacturer of capacitors, and in 1911 formed a second company S.G. Brown Ltd. to manufacture telephone equipment, radio parts, headphones and loudspeakers.

During World War I, S.G. Brown Ltd. set about developing British made gyro compasses. Prior to the war, most gyro compasses had been imported from Germany. Brown's design featured an innovation called liquid ballistic damping, to control the oscillation in the compass caused by a change of course. S.G. Brown Ltd. would go on to become a major producer of gyro compasses for ships and aircraft.

In 1933 the Telegraph Condenser Company became a public limited company. TCC was a leading British maker of capacitors, that was later absorbed into the Plessey company in the 1960s.

Brown retired in 1943 and sold his share of the Telegraph Condenser Company to a consortium, and S.G. Brown Ltd. to the Admiralty. Brown died on 7 August 1948 at Sidmouth, Devon.
