= Four factor formula =

Formula used to calculate nuclear chain reaction growth rate

The four-factor formula, also known as Fermi's four factor formula, is used in nuclear engineering to determine the multiplication of a nuclear chain reaction in an infinite medium.

Four-factor formula: $k_{\infty} = \eta f p \varepsilon$
Symbol	Name	Meaning	Formula	Typical thermal reactor value
$\eta$	Reproduction factor (eta)	(neutrons produced from thermal fissions)/(thermal absorption in fuel isotope)	$\eta = \frac{\nu \sigma_f^F}{\sigma_a^F} = \frac{\nu \Sigma_f^F}{\Sigma_a^F}$	1.65
$f$	Thermal utilization factor	(thermal neutrons absorbed by the fuel isotope)/(thermal neutrons absorbed anywhere)	$f = \frac{\Sigma_a^F}{\Sigma_a}$	0.71
$p$	Resonance escape probability	(fission neutrons slowed to thermal energies without absorption)/(total fission neutrons)	$p \approx \exp \left( -\frac{\sum\limits_{i=1}^{N} N_i I_{r,A,i}}{\left( \overline{\xi} \Sigma_p \right)_{mod}} \right)$	0.87
$\varepsilon$	Fast fission factor	(total number of fission neutrons)/(number of fission neutrons from just thermal fissions)	$\varepsilon \approx 1 + \frac{1-p}{p}\frac{u_f \nu_f P_{FAF}}{f \nu_t P_{TAF} P_{TNL}}$	1.02

The symbols are defined as:

- $\nu$, $\nu_f$ and $\nu_t$ are the average number of neutrons produced per fission in the medium (2.43 for uranium-235).
- $\sigma_f^F$ and $\sigma_a^F$ are the microscopic fission and absorption thermal cross sections for fuel, respectively.
- $\Sigma_a^F$ and $\Sigma_a$ are the macroscopic absorption thermal cross sections in fuel and in total, respectively.
- $\Sigma_f^F$ is the macroscopic fission cross-section.
- $N_i$ is the number density of atoms of a specific nuclide.
- $I_{r,A,i}$ is the resonance integral for absorption of a specific nuclide.
  - $I_{r,A,i} = \int_{E_{th}}^{E_0} dE' \frac{\Sigma_p^{mod}}{\Sigma_t(E')} \frac{\sigma_a^i(E')}{E'}$
- $\overline{\xi}$ is the average lethargy gain per scattering event.
  - Lethargy is defined as decrease in neutron energy.
- $u_f$ (fast utilization) is the probability that a fast neutron is absorbed in fuel.
- $P_{FAF}$ is the probability that a fast neutron absorption in fuel causes fission.
- $P_{TAF}$ is the probability that a thermal neutron absorption in fuel causes fission.
- $P_{TNL}$ is the thermal non-leakage probability

== Multiplication ==
The multiplication factor, k, is defined as (see Nuclear chain reaction):

$k = \frac{\mbox{neutron population following nth generation}}{\mbox{neutron population during nth generation}}$

- If k is greater than 1, the chain reaction is supercritical, and the neutron population will grow exponentially.
- If k is less than 1, the chain reaction is subcritical, and the neutron population will exponentially decay.
- If k = 1, the chain reaction is critical and the neutron population will remain constant.

In an infinite medium, neutrons cannot leak out of the system and the multiplication factor becomes the infinite multiplication factor, $k = k_{\infty}$, which is approximated by the four-factor formula.

== See also ==
- Six factor formula
- Critical mass
- Nuclear chain reaction
- Nuclear reactor
