= Geometric and material buckling =

Concept in nuclear reactor physics

Geometric buckling is a measure of neutron leakage and material buckling is a measure of the difference between neutron production and neutron absorption. When nuclear fission occurs inside of a nuclear reactor, neutrons are produced. These neutrons then, to state it simply, either are absorbed in the reactor core or escape from the reactor. These two processes are referred to as neutron absorption and neutron leakage, and their sum is the neutron loss. When the rate of neutron production is equal to the rate of neutron loss, the reactor is able to sustain a chain reaction of nuclear fissions and is considered a critical reactor.

In the case of a bare, homogeneous, steady-state reactor (that is, a reactor that has only one region, a homogeneous mixture of fuel and coolant, no blanket nor reflector, and which does not change over time), the geometric and material buckling are equal to each other. In one-group diffusion theory the geometric buckling is fixed by the size and shape of the core and the material buckling by its composition, so the equality is the criticality condition of the theory: it determines the critical size of a core of a given composition, or the critical composition and mass of a core of a given size. Both have the dimensions of a reciprocal area, for example $\mathrm{cm}^{-2}.$

The name refers to the curvature of the flux: the buckling $B^2 = -\nabla^2\Phi/\Phi$ is proportional to the rate at which the flux curves or buckles, so that a large core with a flat flux has a small buckling and an infinite medium has none. Because the word has been used both for this geometric eigenvalue and for a combination of material properties, buckling has referred to two different quantities, which Weinberg and Wigner identified as a source of confusion in the literature.

== Derivation ==
Both buckling terms are derived from the diffusion equation for neutrons:

$-D \nabla^2 \Phi + \Sigma_a \Phi = \frac{1}{k} \nu \Sigma_f \Phi$,

where $\Phi$ is the neutron flux, $\Sigma_a$ is the macroscopic absorption cross section, k is the criticality eigenvalue, $\nu$ is the neutrons per fission, $\Sigma_f$ is the macroscopic cross section for fission, and, from diffusion theory, the diffusion coefficient is defined in terms of the macroscopic transport cross section $\Sigma_{\mathrm{tr}}$ as:

$D=\frac{1}{3\Sigma_{\mathrm{tr}}}$.

In addition, the diffusion length is defined as:

$L=\sqrt{\frac{D}{\Sigma_a}}$.

Rearranging the terms, and introducing the infinite multiplication factor $k_\infty = \nu\Sigma_f/\Sigma_a$, the diffusion equation becomes:

$-\frac{\nabla^2 \Phi}{\Phi} = \frac{k_{\infty}/k - 1}{L^2}.$

The left-hand side depends only on the shape of the flux and is the geometric buckling of the reactor. The right-hand side depends only on the cross sections of the core materials; for a critical reactor ($k = 1$) it is the material buckling:

$B_m^2 = \frac{k_{\infty} - 1}{L^2} = \frac{\nu\Sigma_f - \Sigma_a}{D}.$

The modified one-group theory allows these results to be applied to a thermal reactor: the thermal flux is still treated in one group, but the diffusion area is replaced by the migration area $M^2 = L^2 + \tau$, where $\tau$ is the Fermi age, because the neutrons travel some distance while they slow down. The flux and the critical equation then keep their one-group form, with $M^2$ in place of $L^2$.

== Geometric buckling ==
Written in terms of the geometric buckling, the one-group reactor equation is:

$\nabla^2\Phi + B^2 \Phi = 0.$

Together with the boundary condition that the flux vanishes on the extrapolated surface of the core, this is a Helmholtz eigenvalue problem, so that solutions exist only for a discrete set of values of $B^2.$ The smallest eigenvalue, which belongs to the fundamental mode of the flux, is the geometric buckling. Higher eigenvalues belong to harmonics with a steeper gradient at the core boundary; these leak more and decay away in time, so that only the fundamental mode persists in a critical reactor.

In the extrapolated dimensions $a$, $R$ and $H$, the geometric buckling of the fundamental mode for common core geometries is:

Geometry	Geometric buckling B_{g}^{2}
Infinite slab of thickness a	$\left( \frac{\pi}{a} \right)^2$
Sphere of radius R	$\left( \frac{\pi}{R} \right)^2$
Cylinder of height H and radius R	$\left( \frac{\pi}{H} \right)^2 + \left( \frac{2.405}{R} \right)^2$
Parallelepiped with side lengths a, b and c	$\left( \frac{\pi}{a} \right)^2 + \left( \frac{\pi}{b} \right)^2 + \left( \frac{\pi}{c} \right)^2$

These expressions decrease as the core is made larger, and $B_g^2$ tends to zero as the dimensions become infinite and the flux flattens.

Schematic comparison of the diffusion-theory and transport-theory neutron flux near a planar vacuum boundary.

The flux calculated from diffusion theory does not vanish at the physical surface of the core, and diffusion theory is not accurate in the immediate vicinity of a free surface. The solution inside the core is nevertheless close to the exact flux if the flux is assumed to vanish at a small distance beyond the surface; this distance is the extrapolation distance. For most materials it is given by $d = 0.71\lambda_{\mathrm{tr}} = 2.13D$, where $\lambda_{\mathrm{tr}}$ is the transport mean free path. Critical dimensions obtained in this way are measured to the extrapolated boundary, so the extrapolation distance is subtracted to estimate the actual dimensions of the core. The buckling can also be written in terms of the actual dimensions and the extrapolation distance, denoted $\delta$:

Geometry	Geometric buckling B_{g}^{2}
Infinite slab of thickness a	$\left( \frac{\pi}{a+2\delta} \right)^2$
Sphere of radius R	$\left( \frac{\pi}{R+\delta} \right)^2$
Cylinder of height H and radius R	$\left( \frac{\pi}{H+2\delta} \right)^2 + \left( \frac{2.405}{R+\delta} \right)^2$
Parallelepiped with side lengths a, b and c	$\left( \frac{\pi}{a+2\delta} \right)^2 + \left( \frac{\pi}{b+2\delta} \right)^2 + \left( \frac{\pi}{c+2\delta} \right)^2$

== Material buckling ==
Material buckling is the buckling of a homogeneous configuration with respect to its material properties only; it does not depend on the shape of the core. In one-group theory it is:

$B_m^2 = \frac{k_{\infty} - 1}{L^2} = \frac{\nu \Sigma_f - \Sigma_a}{D}.$

Since the geometric buckling of any finite core is positive, a bare core can be critical only if $B_m^2$ is positive as well, that is, only if $k_\infty > 1$: the composition must be able to sustain a chain reaction in an infinite medium, because a finite core additionally loses neutrons by leakage. For a thermal reactor in modified one-group theory the diffusion area is replaced by the migration area, so that $B_m^2 = (k_\infty - 1)/M^2.$

== Critical dimensions and criticality ==
Setting the geometric and material buckling equal gives the critical equation of one-group theory, which determines the critical size of a core of given composition, or the critical composition and hence the critical mass of a core of given size. Written in terms of the effective multiplication factor, the critical equation takes the form:

$k_\mathrm{eff} = \frac{k_\infty}{1 + B_g^2 L^2} = 1.$

The factor $1/(1 + B_g^2 L^2)$ is the non-leakage probability, the probability that a fission neutron is absorbed inside the core rather than lost through its surface; the multiplication factor is then the product of the infinite multiplication factor and the non-leakage probability. Because the material buckling increases with the fissile content of the core and the geometric buckling decreases with its size, a core is supercritical when $B_m^2 > B_g^2$ and subcritical when $B_m^2 < B_g^2.$

For a bare sphere the geometric buckling is $(\pi/R)^2$, so the critical radius measured to the extrapolated boundary is:

$R_c = \pi\sqrt{\frac{L^2}{k_\infty - 1}}.$

The equality of the two bucklings is a feature of one-group theory for a bare, homogeneous core. In a core surrounded by a reflector, the criticality condition is usually a transcendental equation, so that no explicit material buckling can be written and the multiplication factor and the non-leakage probability no longer have simple expressions in terms of the geometry and composition. A multigroup treatment of a bare core keeps an explicit critical equation, such as the two-group form $\frac{k_\infty}{(1+B^2L^2)(1+B^2\tau)} = 1,$ in which the non-leakage probability becomes the product of a fast and a thermal factor.
