= Perry–Robertson formula =

Formula for buckling loads in slender colums

The Perry–Robertson formula is a mathematical formula which is able to produce a good approximation of buckling loads in long slender columns or struts, and is the basis for the buckling formulation adopted in EN 1993. The formula in question can be expressed in the following form:

$\sigma_m = \frac{1}{2} \left(f_y +\sigma_e\left(1+\theta\right) - \sqrt{ \left(f_y + \sigma_e\left(1+\theta\right)\right)^2 - 4f_y\sigma_e} \right)$

with $\theta = \frac{w_{o,1}c}{i^2}$

where:

- $\sigma_m$ is the average longitudinal stress in the beam's cross section
- $f_y$ is the material's elastic limit
- $\sigma_e$ is the average tension measured in the cross section which correspond to the beam's Euler load
- $w_{o,1}$ the amplitude of the initial geometrical imperfection
- $c$ distance from the cross section's centroid to the section's most stressed fiber
- $i$ the section's radius of gyration

Robertson then proposed that $\theta = 0.003\lambda$, where $\lambda$ represents the beam's slenderness.
