= Metal hose =

Flexible metal tube to carry fluids

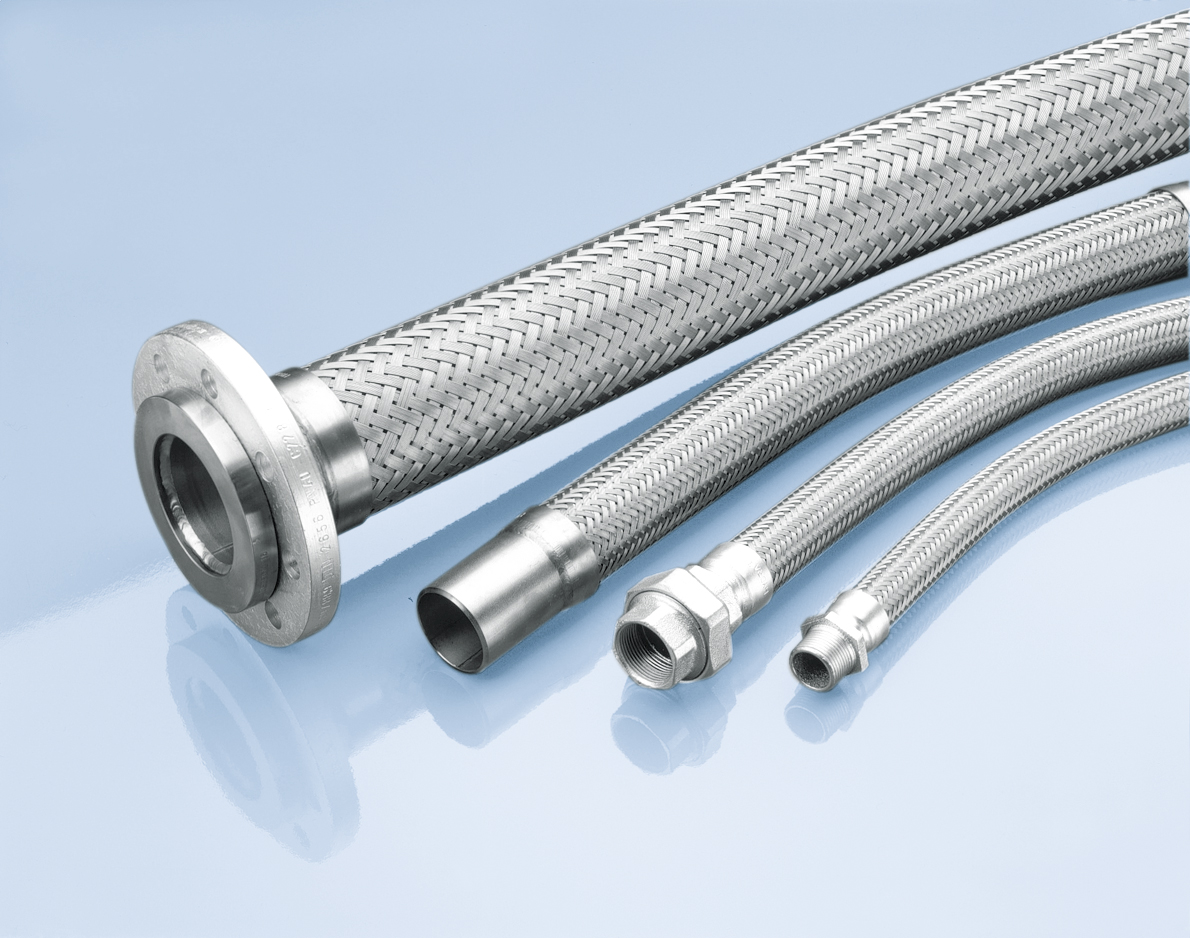
Metal hoses with different connections

A metal hose is a flexible metal line element. There are two basic types of metal hose that differ in their design and application: stripwound hoses and corrugated hoses.

Stripwound hoses have a high mechanical strength (e.g. tensile strength and tear strength). Corrugated hoses can withstand high pressure and provide maximum leak tightness on account of their material. Corrugated hoses also exhibit corrosion resistance and pressure tightness under the most extreme conditions, such as in aggressive seawater or at extreme temperatures such as found in space or when transporting cooled liquid gas. They are particularly well suited for conveying hot and cold substances.

With a history of more than one hundred years, metal hoses have given rise to other flexible line elements, including metal expansion joints, metal bellows and semi-flexible and flexible metal pipes. In Germany alone, there are about 3500 patents relating to metal hoses.

== The origins ==
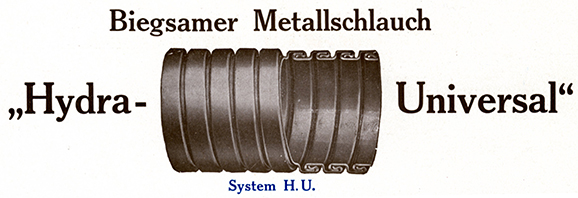
HU Schlauchprofil ca. 1909

The first metal hose was technically a stripwound hose. It was invented in 1885 by the jewellery manufacturer Heinrich Witzenmann (1829–1906) of Pforzheim, Germany, together with the French engineer Eugène Levavassèur. The hose was modelled after the goose throat necklace, a piece of jewellery that consisted of interlacing metal strips. The original design of the hose was based on a helically coiled metal strip with an S-shaped profile. The profile interlocked along the windings of the helical coil. Due to a cavity between the interlocking profiles, this did not create a tight fit. The cavity was sealed by means of a rubber thread.

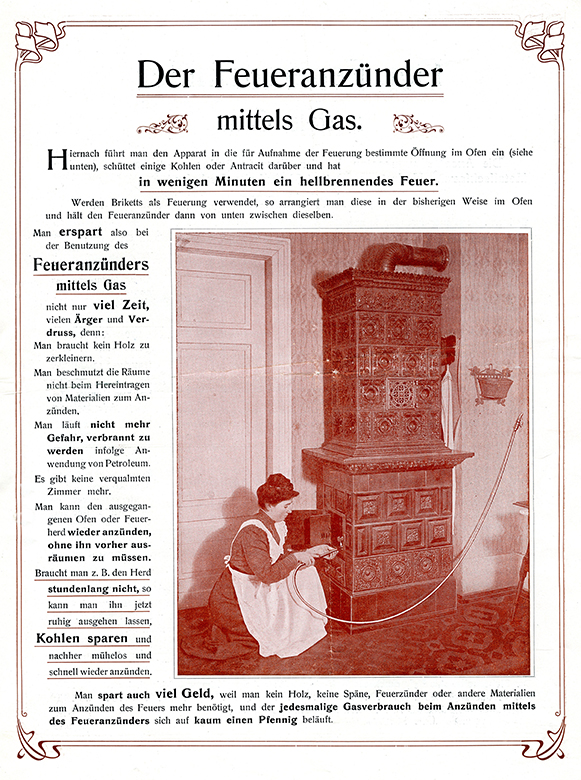
gas applications in 1900

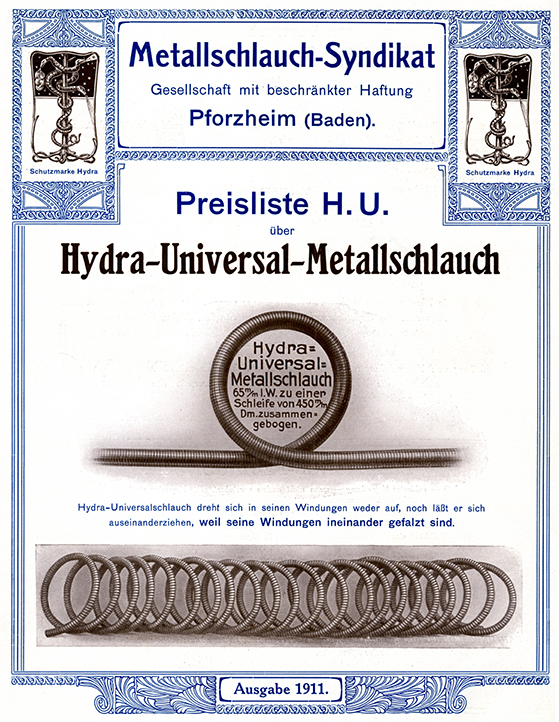
the first metal hose brochure

The result was a permanently flexible, leak-tight steel body of any length and diameter with a high mechanical strength. In France it was patented on 4 August 1885 with the patent number 170 479, and in Germany on 27 August 1885 with the German Reichspatent No. 34 871.

From 1886 to 1905, Heinrich Witzenmann continued to develop numerous noteworthy profiles for hose production which are still of technical significance today. In 1894, he registered a patent for the double metal hose consisting of two coaxial metal hoses twisted in opposite directions. Further modifications of the original form focused on the use of different hose materials and different substances for the thread seal, including rubber, textile threads, asbestos and wire.

An important variant of the metal hose can be attributed to the inventor Siegfried Frank of Frankfurt, Germany. In 1894, he patented the method of rolling a helical corrugation into a smooth rigid pipe. Witzenmann had already made experiments in this direction several years earlier, but did not continue his efforts to create a patentable result. It wasn't until the 1920 and 1930s that the hotel administrator Albert Dreyer of Lucerne, Switzerland, succeeded in creating a satisfactory annular corrugation for the manufacture of metal corrugated hoses.

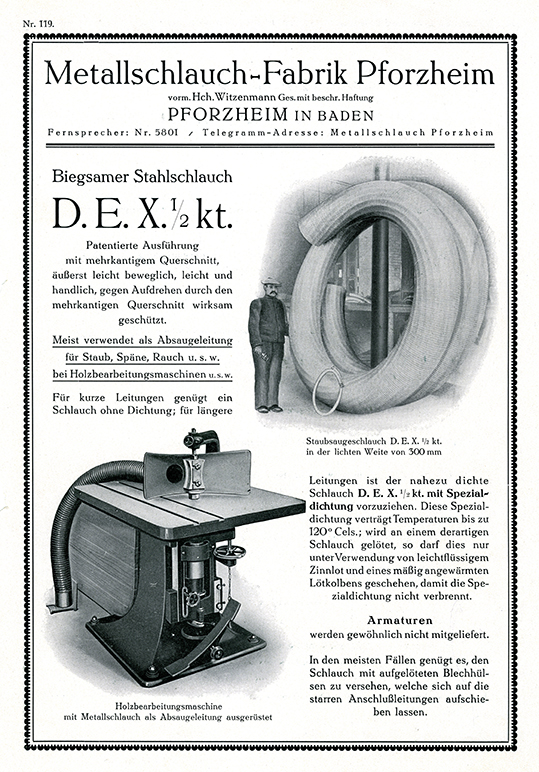
technical information from 1915

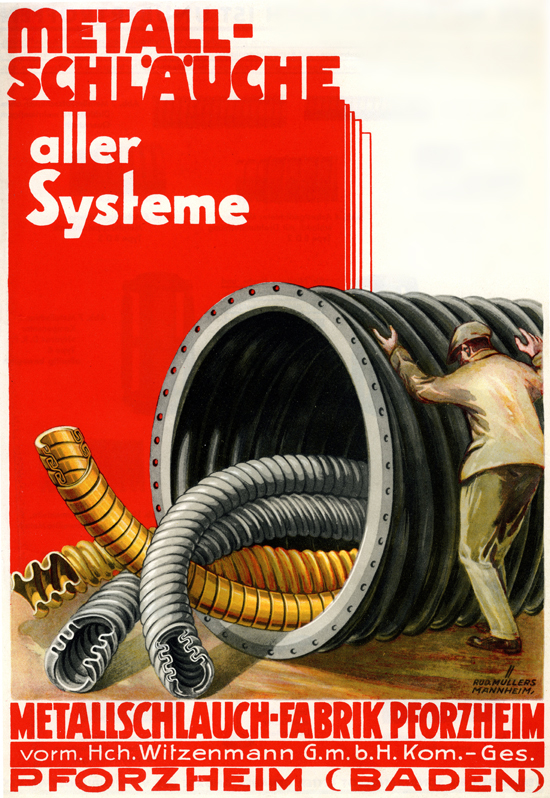
metal hoses for the industry

=== Continued development ===
Emil Witzenmann, son of Heinrich Witzenmann, developed a form of the metal hose in 1909 that eliminated the need for any kind of sealing thread, be it of rubber, textile fibre or asbestos. In this type of hose, the strip edges do not interlock but abut each other and are seamlessly welded together. In 1920, Emil Witzenmann invented the metal expansion joint. This invention was based on the double-walled, welded, corrugated metal hose (with a wound protection sheath) with radial flexibility. In 1929, it became possible for the first time to produce metal bellows. These were also developed by Albert Dreyer of Lucerne, but independently of Witzenmann.

Metal bellows are created by rolling annular corrugations into a smooth extruded or welded pipe. In 1946, Dreyer developed a multi-walled joint that was designed to accommodate axial movements as well: the axial expansion joint.

== The stripwound hose ==
Stripwound hoses consist of spirals that are loosely interlocked. This causes them to be highly flexible. These hoses come in two basic variants – either with an engaged profile or with an interlocked profile such as the Agraff profile. Both variants offer high flexibility due to the profile structure. However, this results in their not being fully leak-tight. For this reason, they are often used as insulating or protective hoses around an inner tube.

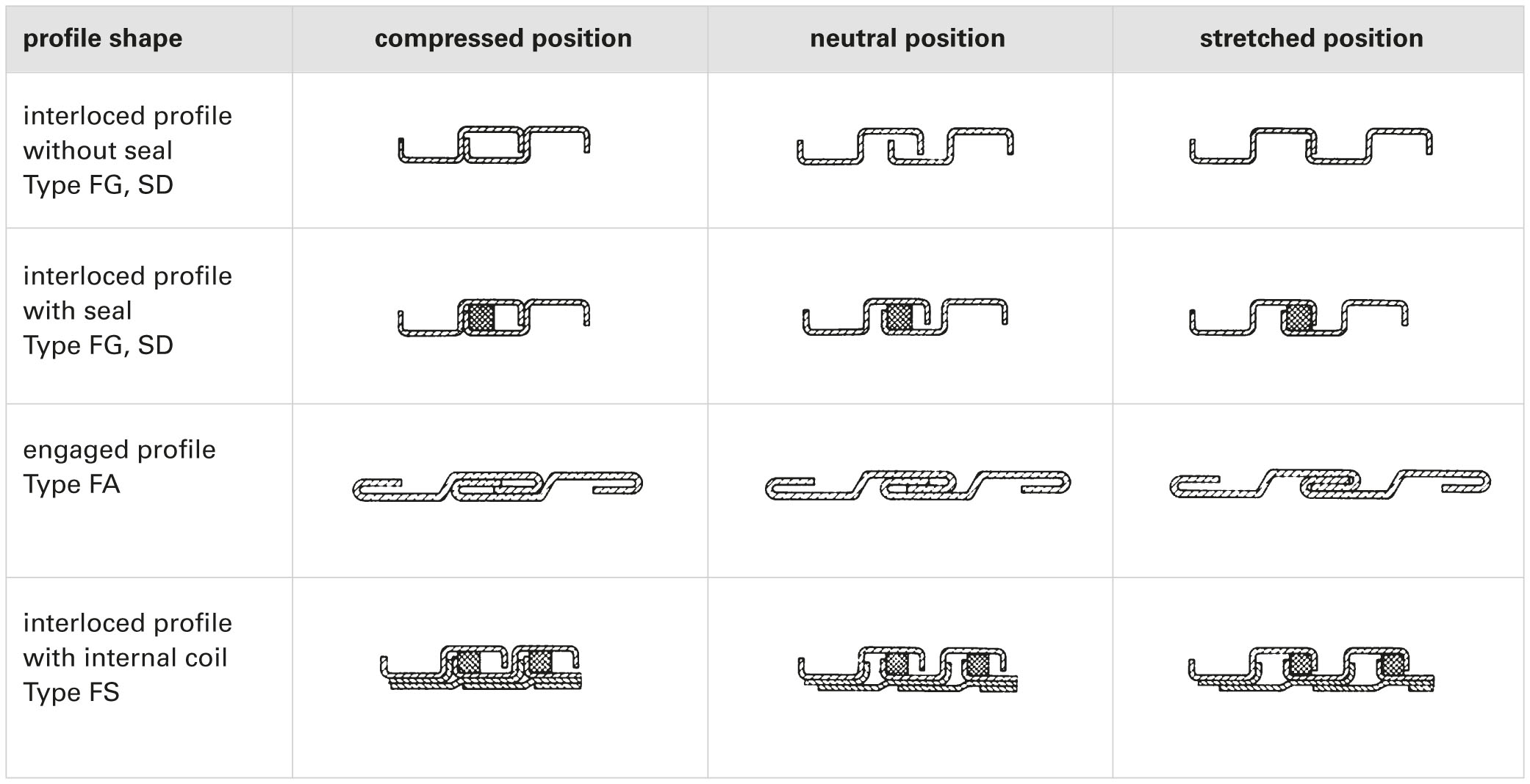

=== Structure and function ===
Stripwound hoses are created by helically winding cold-rolled, profiled metal strip onto a mandrel where the helical coils are interconnected but remain movable due to the type of profiling. This principle of a movable connection between the profiled coils leads to the high flexibility and movability of metal stripwound hoses. Most strips are made of galvanized steel, stainless steel or brass, which can optionally be chromium- or nickel-plated.

=== Properties of stripwound hoses ===
Stripwound hoses exhibit enormous tensile and transversal pressure resistance, a high torsional strength and excellent chemical and thermal stability. Due to their structure, they are not 100% leak-tight.

=== Types of stripwound hose ===
The metal hose properties are determined by several factors: the profile shape, the strip dimensions, the material and, if applicable, the type of seal.

Stripwound hoses are available with round and polygonal cross-sections.

Automotive engineering most often uses metallically sealed stripwound hoses. The introduction of a cotton, rubber or ceramic sealing thread into a specially profiled chamber during the winding process leads to greater tightness. For maximum tightness, the stripwound hoses can also be sheathed in PVC or silicone. The profile shapes range from simple engaged profiles to highly secure Agraff profiles.

=== Application areas for stripwound hoses ===
Stripwound hoses are frequently used as flexible temperature-resistant and ageing-resistant elements in exhaust equipment, especially in trucks and special vehicles such as tractors. They are also used as protective hoses for light conductors and electrical lines in fibre optics, or in measuring and control equipment. As miniature hoses with diameters ranging from 2.0–0.3 mm, they are also employed in medical technology, such as for endoscopy.

In addition, stripwound hoses are used for extracting and conveying substances such as smoke, shavings, granulate, etc. They are also suitable as protective hoses for corrugated lines to prevent over-extension and to act as a liner (guide hose inside a corrugated hose) to optimise flow conditions.

Stripwound metal hoses also include "bendable arms", or "swan necks". These consist of a round wire coil over which a triangular wire is wound. They can be bent in any direction and remain stationary in any position. These are used for the flexible supports of lamps, magnifying glasses and microphones, for example.

== The corrugated hose ==
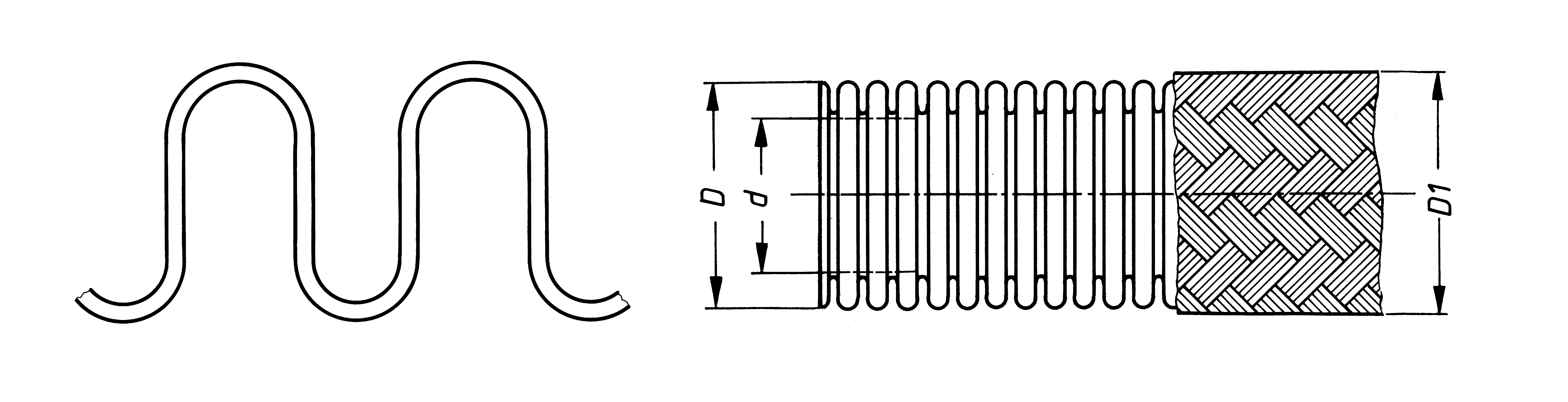
Profilzeichnung eines Wellschlauches

Corrugated hoses are pressure and vacuum tight. The permissible operating pressures for hoses with small dimensions reach 380 bar (with a 3-fold burst pressure safety factor). The pressure resistance of large dimensions is lower for technical reasons. Stainless steel models have a temperature resistance of up to approx. 600 °C, depending on the pressure load, and even higher values are possible with special materials. In the low temperature range, stainless steel corrugated hoses can be used down to -270 °C.

=== Structure and function ===
Corrugated hoses are used as economical, flexible connecting elements that permit movement, thermal expansion and vibrations, and that can be used as filling hoses. The starting material is a seamless or longitudinally welded, thin-walled tube into which corrugations are introduced by mechanical or hydraulic means using special tools. Corrugated hoses are absolutely leak-tight and are used to convey liquids or gases under pressure or as vacuum lines. They are also referred to as pressure hoses. Their special design achieves both flexibility and pressure resistance.

=== Types of corrugated hose ===
There are two basic variants of corrugated hoses that differ in their type of corrugation: annular corrugation and helical corrugation. In hoses with helical corrugation, usually a right-handed coil with a constant pitch that runs along the whole length of the hose. The annular corrugation, on the other hand, consists of a large number of equally-spaced parallel corrugations whose main plane is perpendicular to the hose axis. Hoses with annular corrugation have decided advantages over those with helical corrugation:

- When installed properly, they are free of damaging torsional strain during pressure surges.
- Because of the shape of their profile, they connect smoothly to connection fittings.

This increases process reliability during conduit assembly and use. For this reason, annular corrugated hoses are far more common, with only a few exceptions.

=== Manufacturing corrugated hoses ===
The first step in creating a corrugated hose is to shape the starting metal strip from the coil into a smooth, longitudinally welded tube. The strip is continuously welded using the highly precise shielding gas welding method. Then the tube is corrugated by one of the following procedures:

- The hydraulic corrugation method expands the tube from the inside to the outside. This method is used to create annular corrugated hoses.
- The mechanical corrugation method, on the other hand, is used to produce both annular and helical corrugated hoses. Usually, multiple profiled pressure rollers are positioned around the tube with an offset that enables them to roll the desired corrugation profile into the tube from the outside to the inside. Both corrugation methods cause material hardening and thus increase the pressure and fatigue resistance of the corrugated hoses.

In addition, corrugated hoses can be manufactured by a special method that is closely related to the manufacture of stripwound hoses. In this procedure, the starting strip is given a corrugated profile in a longitudinal direction. This profile strip is then wound helically and the overlapping coils are tightly welded along the helical seam. After corrugation, the hose may be equipped with a braided sheath (see below). In this case, the hose then passes through a braiding machine that has circumferential wire coil holders, or so-called bobbins.

The wire bundles are wrapped helically around the hose while also being alternately layered one over the other. This creates a tubular braid with the characteristic crisscross pattern. After the fittings are mounted, the hose line is complete. Production-related testing is an integral part of the manufacturing process. It encompasses incoming tests of the starting material as well as dimensional, leakage and pressure testing of the finished conduit.

=== Flexibility ===
The flexibility of the hose is achieved by means of the elastic behaviour of the corrugation profile. When the hose is bent, the outer corrugations separate while the inner corrugations are squeezed together. The flexibility, bending behaviour and pressure stability of corrugated hoses depend on the selected profile shape. While flexibility increases with an increase in profile height and a decrease in corrugation spacing, pressure resistance decreases. The frequently required semi-flexible bending behaviour is achieved by flat profiles. Depending on the use of the hose, special application-specific profile shapes can be implemented

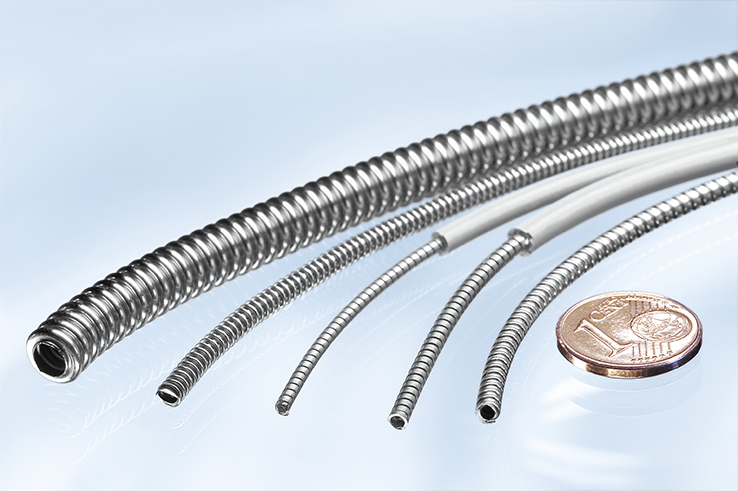
miniature metal hoses for medical
or optoelectronical applications

Pressure resistance and flexibility can also be altered by varying the wall thickness. A reduction in the wall thickness increases the bending capacity but reduces the pressure resistance of the hose.

== Special designs ==
Miniature hoses with a diameter of only a few millimetres are highly flexible while also being very robust. When provided with a special sheathing, they can be used in minimally invasive surgery. Models with an inner liner (see below) and special connectors are used for laser or optoelectronic applications. The smallest diameter for miniature hoses is 1.8 mm.

== Application areas of metal hoses ==
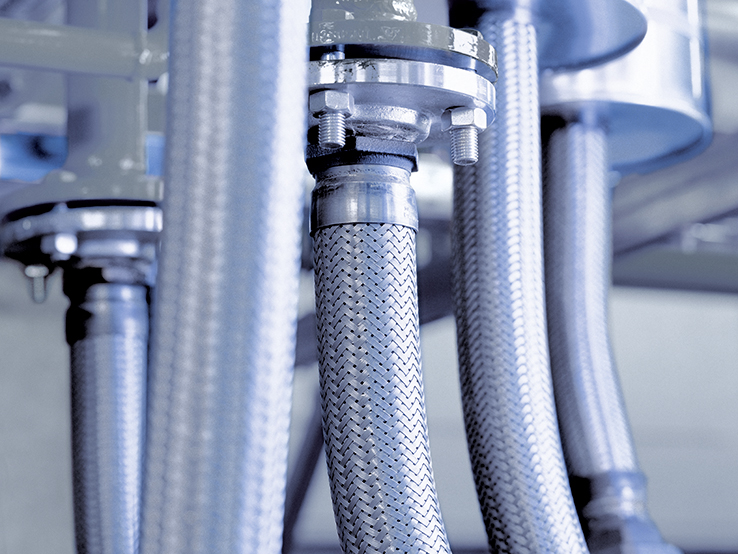
corrogated hoses for industrial applications

With its ability to meet high demands for conveying hot and cold substances, this modern technology has the following major areas of application:

- Electrical industry and mechanical engineering: as a protective hose for electrical cables or light conductors
- As a suction, conveying and coolant hose, e.g. when conveying and transporting liquid gas
- Automotive industry: as an exhaust gas hose that acts as a vibration decoupler in exhaust systems
- As a ventilation hose in technical building equipment
- Industry
- Measuring and control equipment
- Medical equipment
- Aviation and space travel
- Reactor technology
- Alternative energy (solar heat, wind turbines, etc.)

== Properties of metal hoses ==
Metal hoses resist high pressures and offer maximum tightness on account of the material from which they are manufactured. Their flexibility lends them tensile and tear strength. Also, they are characterised by their corrosion and pressure resistance, even under extreme conditions such as when exposed to aggressive seawater, strong vibrations and extreme temperatures such as in space or when transporting cooled liquid gas.

== Braiding around metal hoses ==
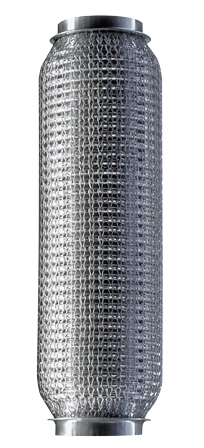
braided conduit for motion decoupling in vehicle exhaust systems

To increase pressure resistance, metal hoses can be equipped with one- or two-layer braiding. The braiding is firmly connected to the hose fittings on both sides to absorb the longitudinal forces caused by internal pressure. Due to its inherent flexibility, the braid moulds itself perfectly to the movement of the hose. Hose braiding consists of right- and left-handed wrapped wire bundles that are alternately layered one over the other. This not only prevents hose lengthening due to internal pressure, but also absorbs external tensile forces and protects the outside of the hose. The basic material of the wire braid is usually the same as that of the corrugated hose. It is also possible to select different materials in the interest of greater corrosion resistance or for economic considerations.

The braiding also greatly increases the resistance of the hose to internal pressure. The braid flexibly moulds itself to the movement of the hose. This applies even if a second braiding is used, which further increases pressure resistance. The method by which the braiding is attached to the connection fittings depends on the type of fitting and the demands on the hose. Under rough operating conditions, an additional round wire coil can be wound over the braid or the braid can be sheathed in a protective hose.

Figure: Metal hose with braid protection as a decoupler for vehicle exhaust systems

=== Functional principle of the metal braid ===
Wire braiding functions on the lazy tongs principle. When axial tension is applied to the hose, the braid reaches its extension limit. This means that the wires lie tightly spaced with the smallest crossing angle, creating a hose braiding of the smallest possible diameter and the largest possible length. When the hose is axially compressed, the crossing angle and diameter increase to maximum values.

== Sources ==
- Koch, Hans-Eberhard: 100 Jahre Metallschlauch Pforzheim, 1995
- Witzenmann Group: company archives
- Company history of Witzenmann GmbH, by Gregor Mühlthaler
- Reinhard Gropp, Marc Seckner, Bernd Seeger: Flexible Metallic Pipes. In: Die Bibliothek der Technik 382. Süddeutscher Verlag onpact, Munich 2016.
- Carlo Burkhardt, Bert Balmer: Automobile Decoupling Element Technology In: Die Bibliothek der Technik 237. Süddeutscher Verlag onpact, Munich 2008.
- metal hose manual. Witzenmann, Pforzheim 2007.
