= Piping Technology and Products =

Piping Technology & Products, Inc.
- Company type: Private
- Industry: Manufacturing
- Founded: 1978
- Headquarters: Houston, TX
- Area served: Worldwide
- Products: Pipe Supports/Spring Hangers; Expansion Joints; Pre-Insulated Pipe Supports; Slide Plates and Pipe Rollers; Shock / Vibration Controls; Pipe Shoes, Guides & Anchors; Pipe Clamps and Risers; Clevis Hangers and Beam Attachments; Pipe Support Hardware; Saddle Supports and Coverings; Hold-Down Pipe Clamps; Pressure Vessels and Tanks; Pig Launchers / Receivers
- Services: 24x7 Quick Turn / Emergency Service; Field Services and Installation / Maintenance; Stress Analysis and Product Testing; Engineering and Design Services; Online Technical Webinar Presentation

Piping Technology and Products is a privately owned pipe support manufacturing and engineering company headquartered in Houston, Texas, United States. Its wholly owned subsidiaries are US Bellows, Sweco Fab, Fronek Anchor/Darling Enterprise, and Pipe Shields. These companies provide pipe supports, expansion joints, shock and vibration controls, and pre-insulated supports to a variety of industries including LNG, chemical, petrochemical, semiconductors, pulp & paper, and aerospace.

== History ==
- 1975: Durga D. Agrawal and Alan Muller entered into a partnership and established an engineering and consulting company called Stress Technology & Products. The company specialized in design engineering and computerized stress analysis, but evolved into a manufacturing and fabrication business over the next three years.
- 1978: The company was reorganized as Piping Technology & Products, Inc. and developed the constant load spring hanger design.
- 1986: Acquired Sweco, Fab. Inc., an ASME U-Stamp Shop that designs and fabricates pressure vessels, pig launchers and receivers, instrument supports, conical strainers, spectacle and line blinds, orifice plates and flanges, duct and transition pieces, bellmouth reducers and dampers / louvers.
- 1995: Acquired RM Manufacturing from RM Engineered Products of Ladson, South Carolina. Began manufacturing metallic expansion joints.
- 1997: Acquired US Bellows from Ketema LP of San Diego, California
- 2003: Launched field services division and began services calls, installations and maintenance
- 2004: Acquired Fronek Group (Fronek Anchor/Darling Enterprises, Inc.)
- 2007:ISO 9001: 2015 Certification
- 2011: Launched 3D printing of Pipe supports and expansion joints to evaluate designs
- 2014: Partnered with DST to offer Compact Spring Supports
- 2024: Capital investments in mass customization manufacturing in Houston based headquarters
