= US Bellows =

U.S. Bellows, Inc.
- Founded: 1997 (Acquired)
- Headquarters: Houston, Texas
- Products: Metallic Expansion Joints; Fabric Expansion Joints; Metallic Bellows
- Website: U.S. Bellows, Inc. Expansion Joints Blog

US Bellows is a manufacturer of metal bellows, fabric expansion joints, and metallic expansion joints including refractory lined, hinged, gimbal, slip-type, in-line pressure balanced, and elbow pressure balanced expansion joints. It was acquired by Piping Technology and Products in 1997 from Ketema-U.S. Bellows, Inc. and is now located in Houston, Texas. U.S. Bellows, Inc. provides a variety of expansion joints for piping and duct systems and has been a member of the Expansion Joint Manufacturers Association, Inc. since 2002. In December 2011, U.S. Bellows acquired all bellows assets of the former Lortz Manufacturing companies, doubling its manufacturing capabilities. It is a privately held company owned by Durga D. Agrawal. It is a subsidiary of Piping Technology and Products. These companies provide pipe supports and expansion joints to international companies including Dow Chemical Company, Chevron Corporation, ExxonMobil, and Bechtel.
