= Metal expansion joint =

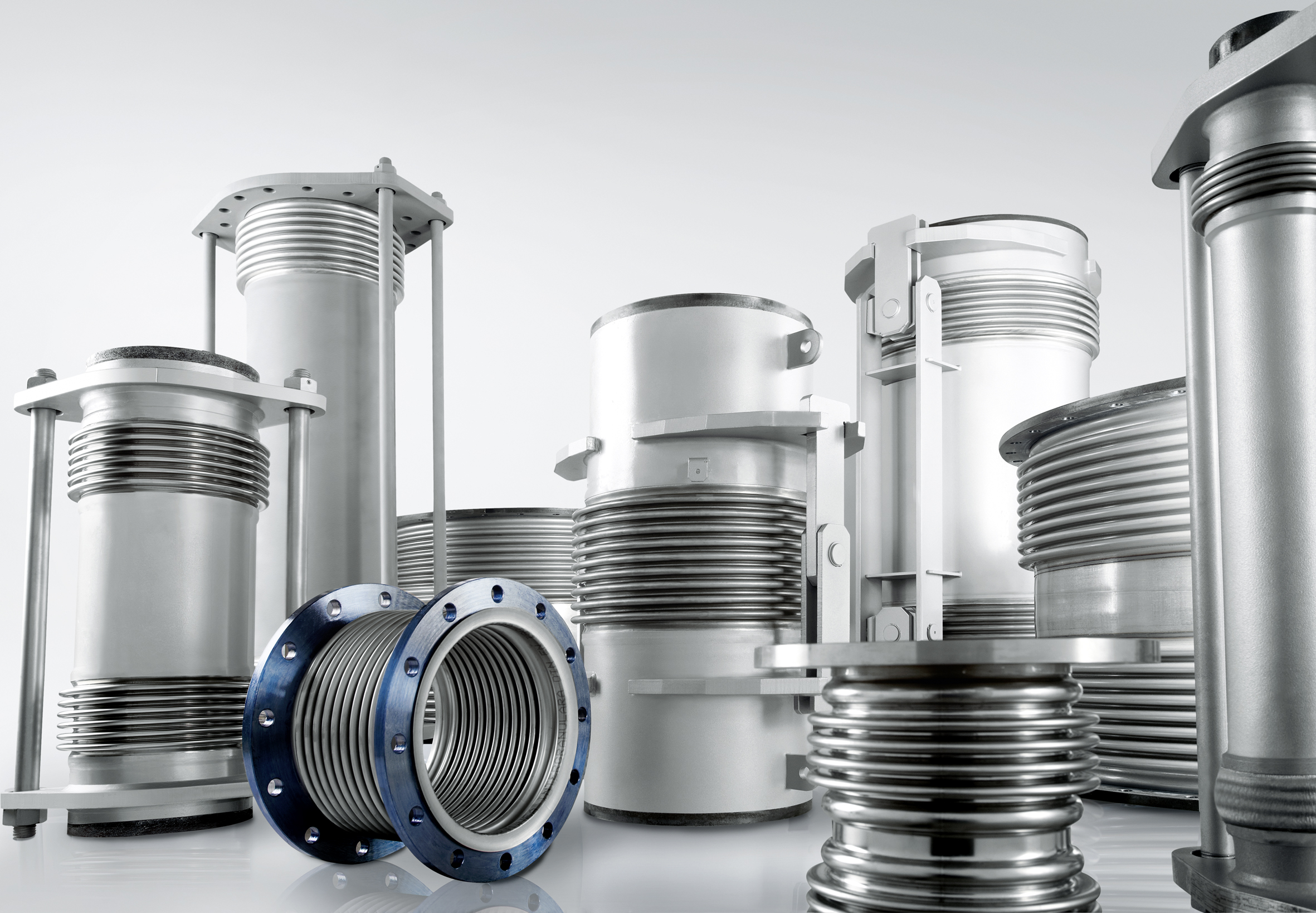
Expansion joints for industrial applications

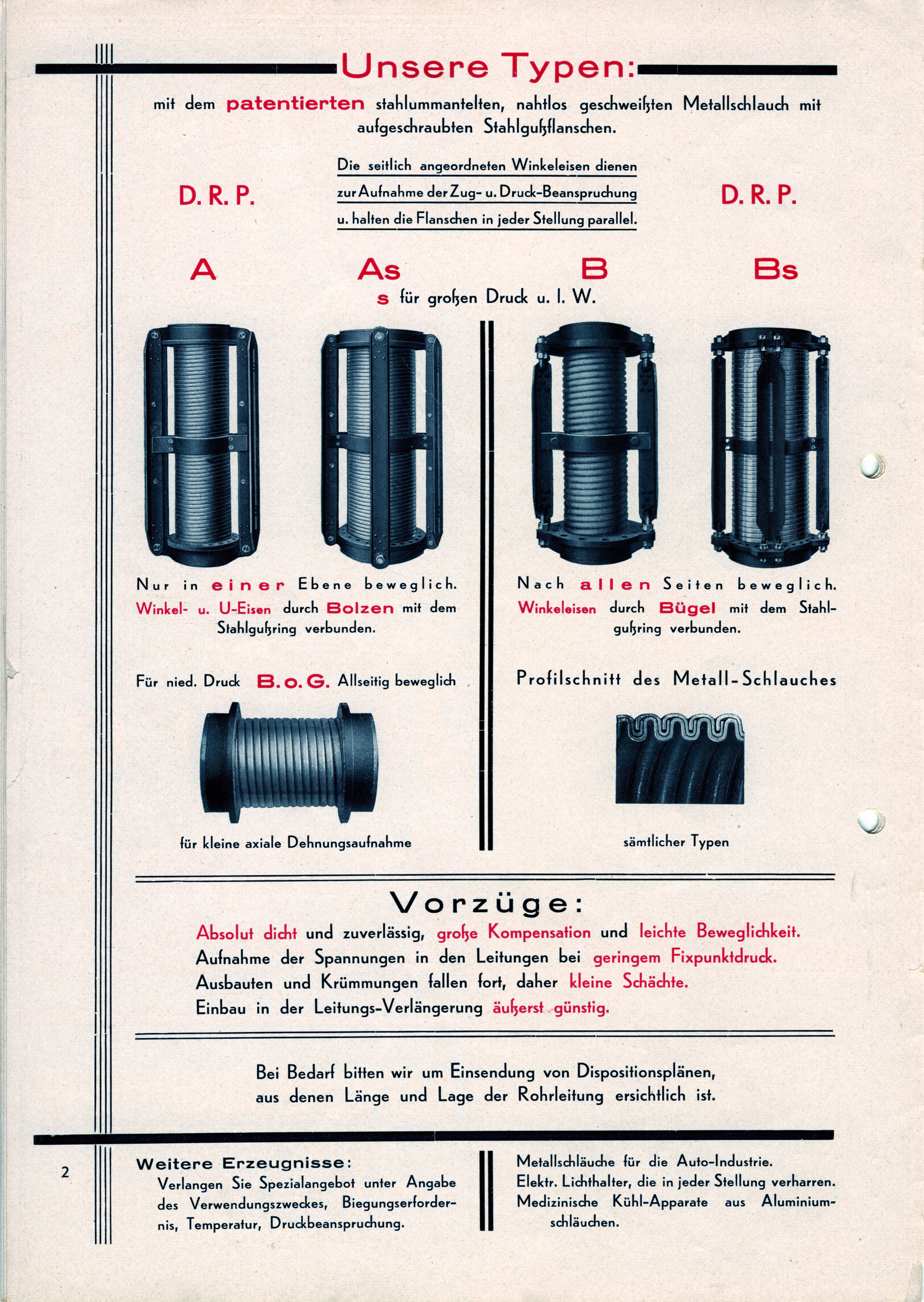
Technical information 1930

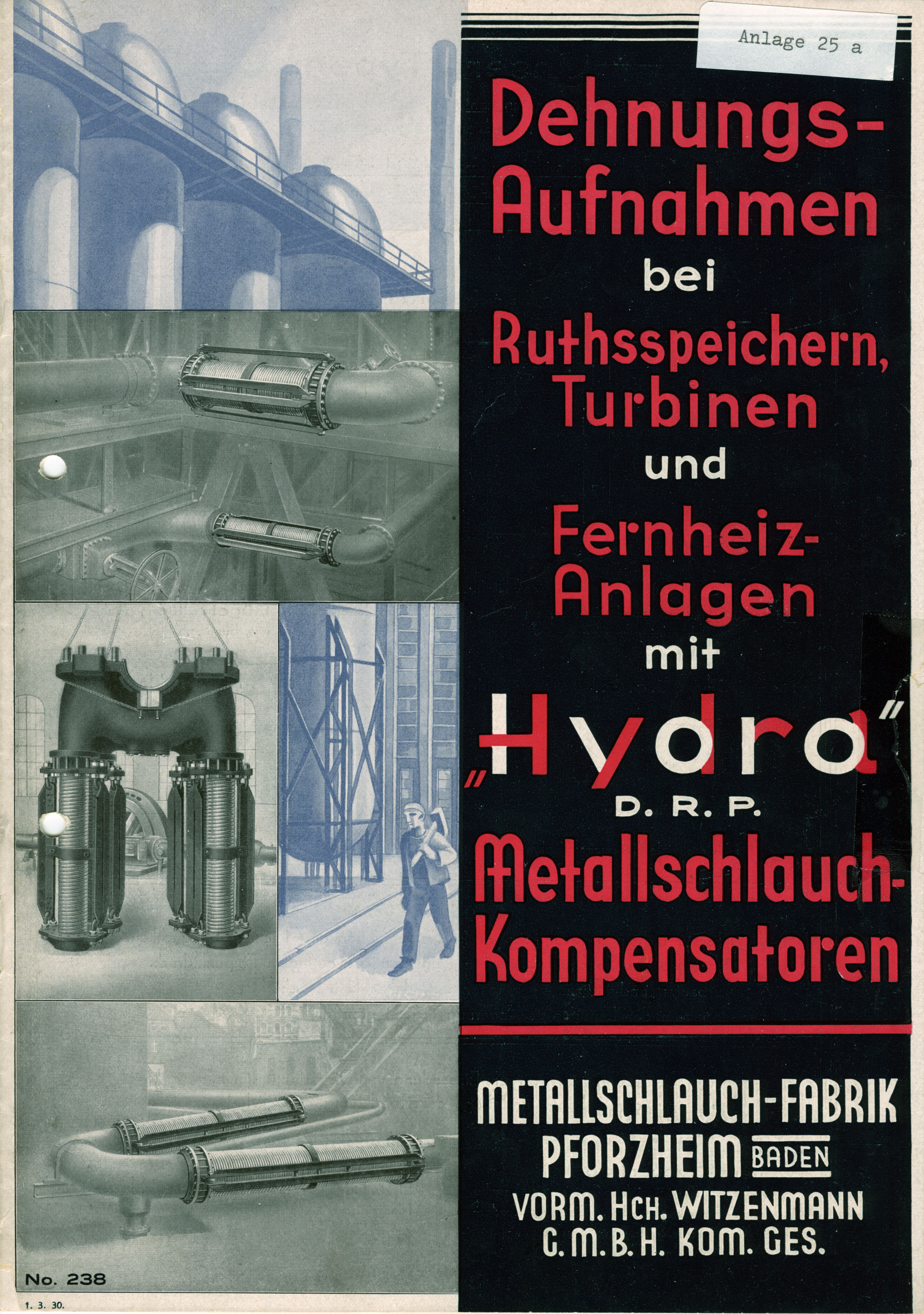
Expansion joints 1930

Metal expansion joints (also called compensators) are compensating elements for thermal expansion and relative movement in pipelines, containers and machines. They consist of one or more metal bellows, connectors at both ends, and tie rods that depend on the application. They are differentiated according to the three basic types of movement: axial, angular and lateral expansion joints. Expansion joints have usage in various sectors, like energy production, paper industry, chemical industry, water treatment, oil and gas. Expansion joints can be used wherever thermal movements or vibration occurs in pipelines.

== The origins ==
Emil Witzenmann was considered the inventor of expansion joints.

lateral expansion joint

for industrial applications

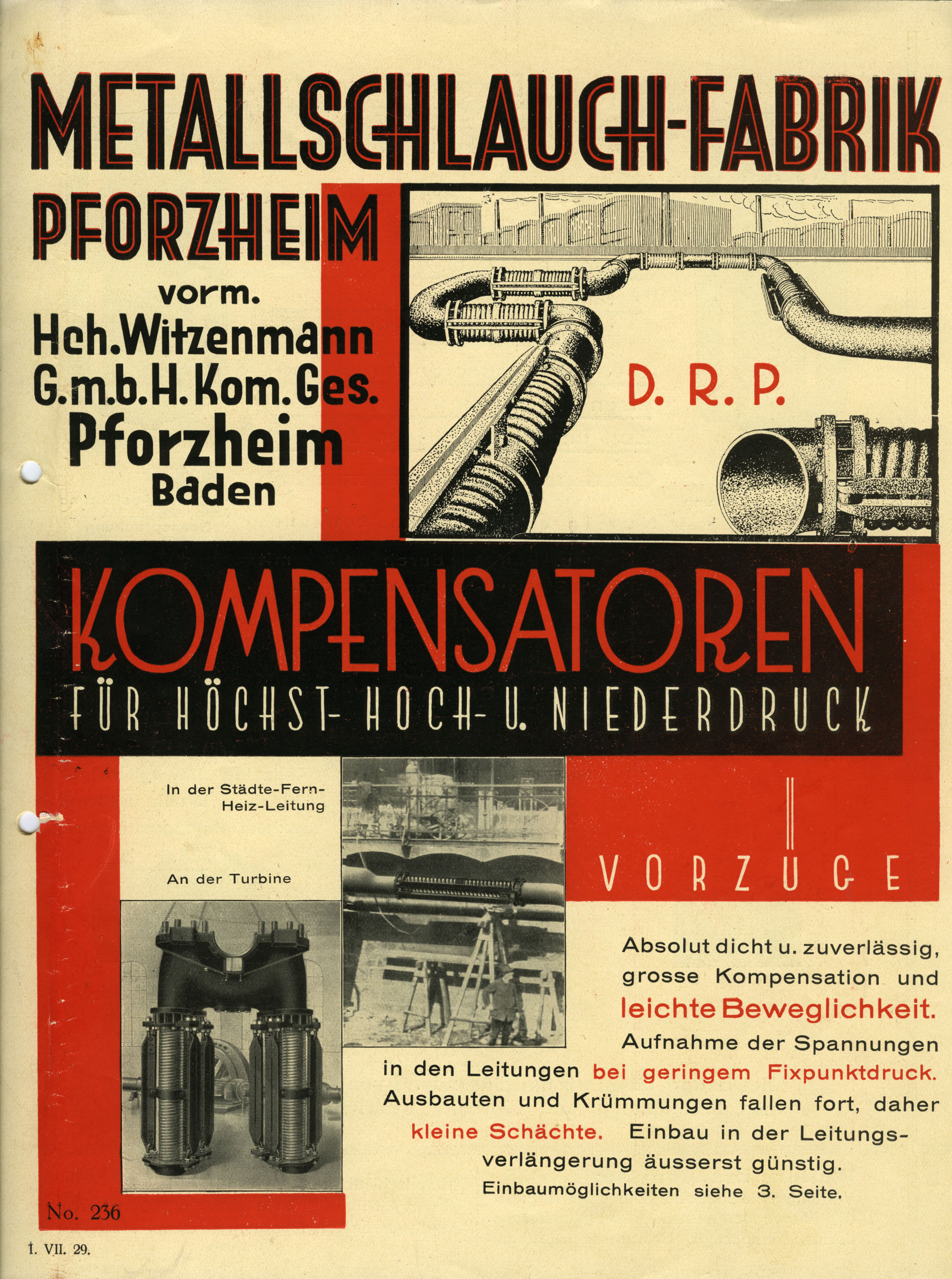
High and low pressure

expansion joints;1934

In 1920, he applied for a patent for the first so-called flexible metal tube expansion joint, German Reichspatent No. 367 185, from 29 July 1920. From a technical point of view, this precursor of today's expansion joints is a large, pressure-tight flexible metal hose with a defined, restricted freedom of movement. In the 1930s, the 'metal hose' or 'flexible metal tube' principle was replaced by the metal bellows as the central functional element. This design principle – metal bellows with connection pieces – is still the structural basis of modern metal expansion joints today.

However, records now show that a factory was Founding of Henri Ehrmann & Co. a factory for metal cartridges in Karlsruhe / Germany in 1872. In 1898 A patent was applied for "flexible metal tubes with beading folds" (convolutions), Production of bellows and metal hoses of seamless corrugated tubes for industrial applications, was therefore first ever manufacturer by, the company now known as, The BOA Group.

=== The multi-ply design ===
In modern expansion joints, the metal bellows are often produced with a so-called multi-ply design. To increase both flexibility and stability, multiple thin plies of metal are layered to form the bellows walls. There are two basic design types: The multi-ply and the multi-walled bellows structure. The multi-ply structure consists of a pressure-tight, longitudinally welded outer and inner cylinder of stainless steel. In between these cylinders is an open, spiral cylinder which forms multiple plies depending on the design. The multi-walled structure consists of several concentric, longitudinally welded cylinders. Each cylinder forms a pressure-tight and closed "wall".

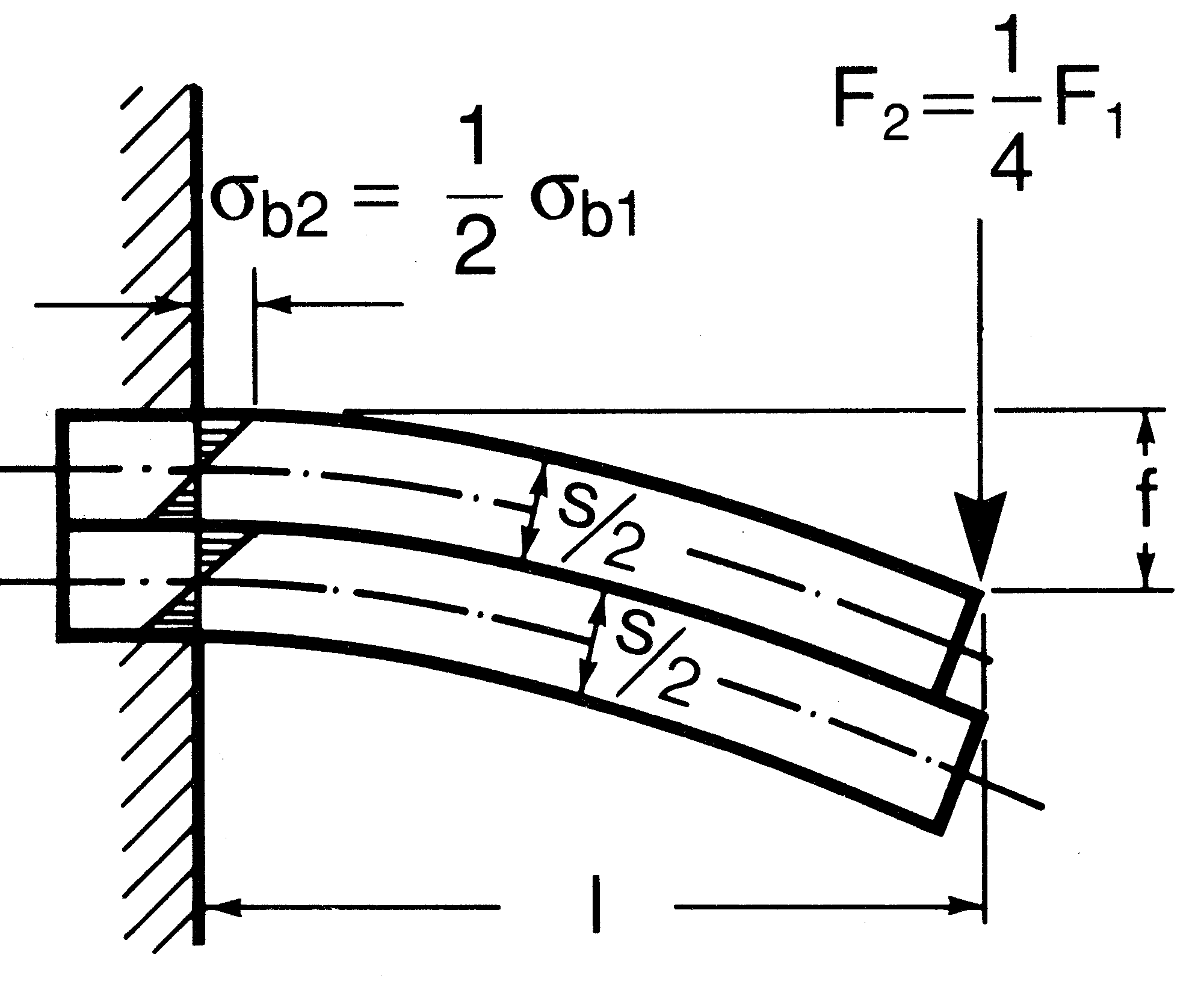
multi walled structure

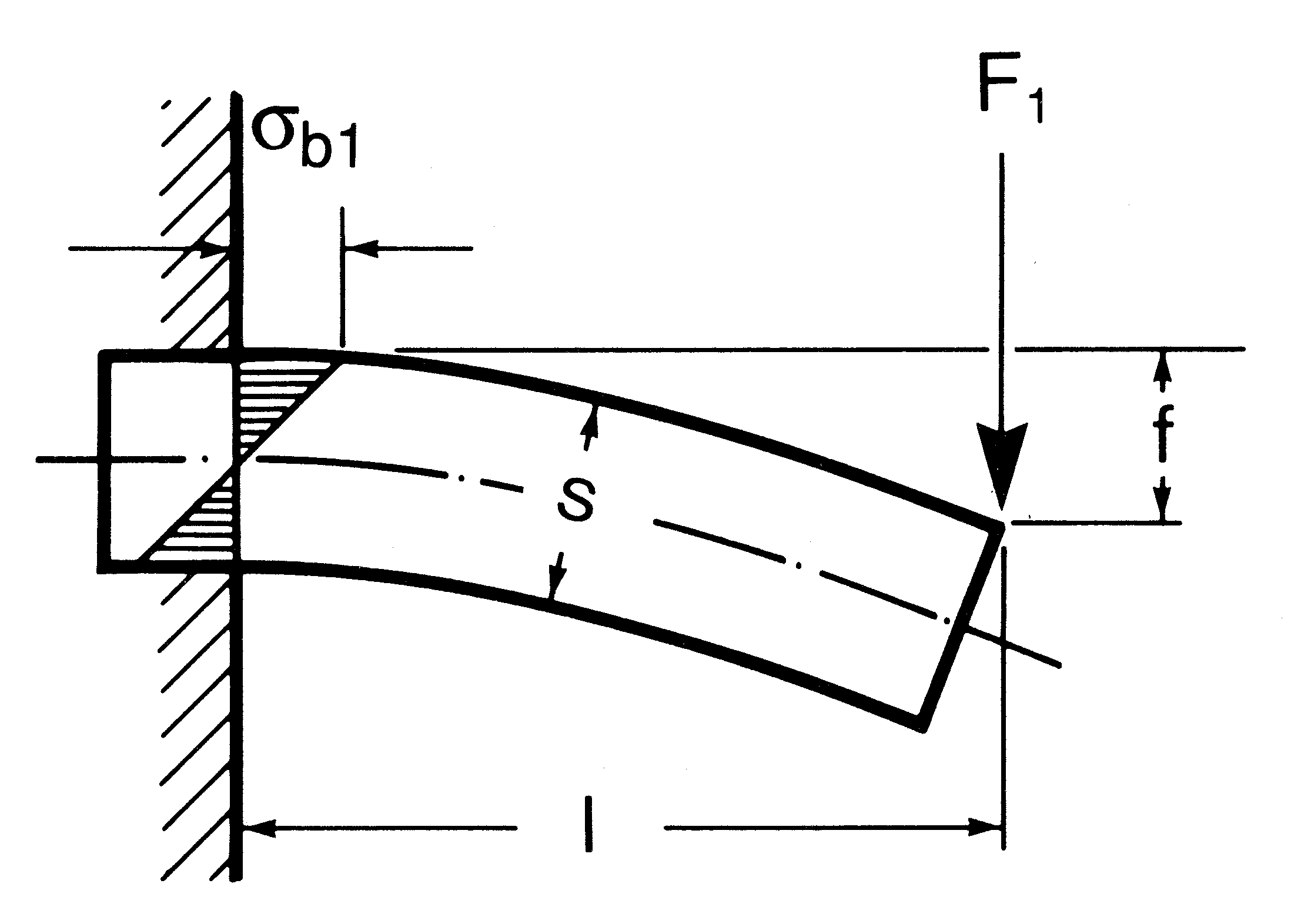
single walled structure

The main advantages of multi-walled bellows:

- Resistance to high and very high pressures
- Large movement absorption
- Small dimensions
- Small adjusting force rates
- Optimal compensation in a very small space
- Early leak indication (in case of damage) via standard check hole
- Complete burst resistance
- Possibility of permanent leak monitoring in critical media
- Economical use of high-quality, corrosion-resistant materials such as Inconel, Incoloy, Hastelloy, titanium and Tantal
- Insulation against structure-borne noise up to 20 dB

This design has both technical and economic advantages. For example, the bellows can be constructed of different materials, such as high-alloy stainless steels for the pipes in contact with the medium (inside and/or outside), and low-alloy stainless steels for the intermediate plies.

== Compensation types ==
=== Axial ===
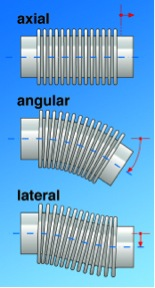
expansion joint movements

In axial compensation, the thermal expansion of a straight line section between two fixed points is absorbed by an axial expansion joint. The distance between two fixed points defines the pipeline length requiring compensation, and thus determines the axial movement that must be achieved by the expansion joint.

The following basic principles apply to axial compensation:

- The single-plane or multi-plane piping system is subdivided into straight sections by fixed point in such a way that each section can be compensated by a single axial expansion joint.
- The fixed points must be designed to withstand the pressure and spring forces of the axial expansion joint, the frictional forces of the pipe guides and the flow forces.
- Long pipes must be protected against kinking between the fixed points using pipe guides.
- The axial expansion joint should be installed in the immediate vicinity of a fixed point and a pipe guide.
- Impermissibly large fixed point loads can be prevented by using axial expansion joints that are relieved of pressure forces.

=== Angular ===
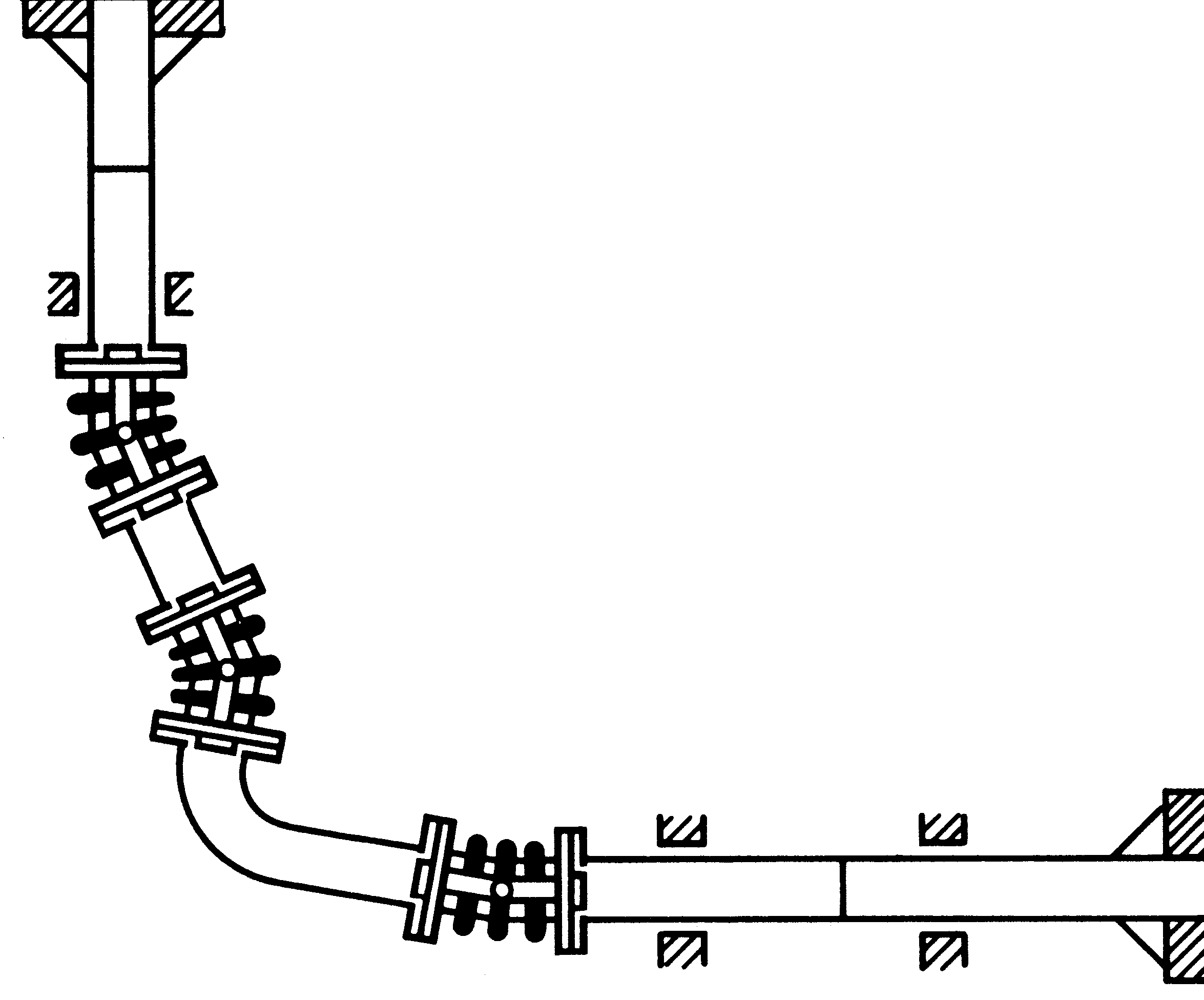

The angular compensation of thermal expansion requires at least two, and for full compensation even three, angular expansion joints. Angular expansion joints offer a wide variety of combination options in so-called two-hinge or three-hinge systems.

Single-plane three-hinged systems make do with one-sided angularly flexible expansion joints, while multi-plane three-hinged systems for absorbing thermal expansion in three axial directions require at least two gimbal expansion joints that are angularly flexible on all sides. The following basic rules apply to angular compensation:

- Always at least two angular expansion joints are needed.
- Angular expansion joints are always associated with multiple redirections of flow by 90°.
- Because angular expansion joints (as hinged expansion joints) themselves absorb the compressive forces released by the bellows, the fixed points in the pipeline are only loaded by their adjusting forces and torques, by the frictional forces of the pipe guides and by the flow forces.
- Angular compensation is specifically designed for complex multi-plane pipework.

=== Lateral ===
Lateral compensation is likewise associated with a redirection of flow by 90° within single-plane or multi-plane piping systems. Usually, lateral expansion joints are installed in existing right-angle redirections in the system. The movement of a lateral expansion joint always consists of the desired lateral movement and a slight unavoidable axial movement that comes from the expansion joint itself.

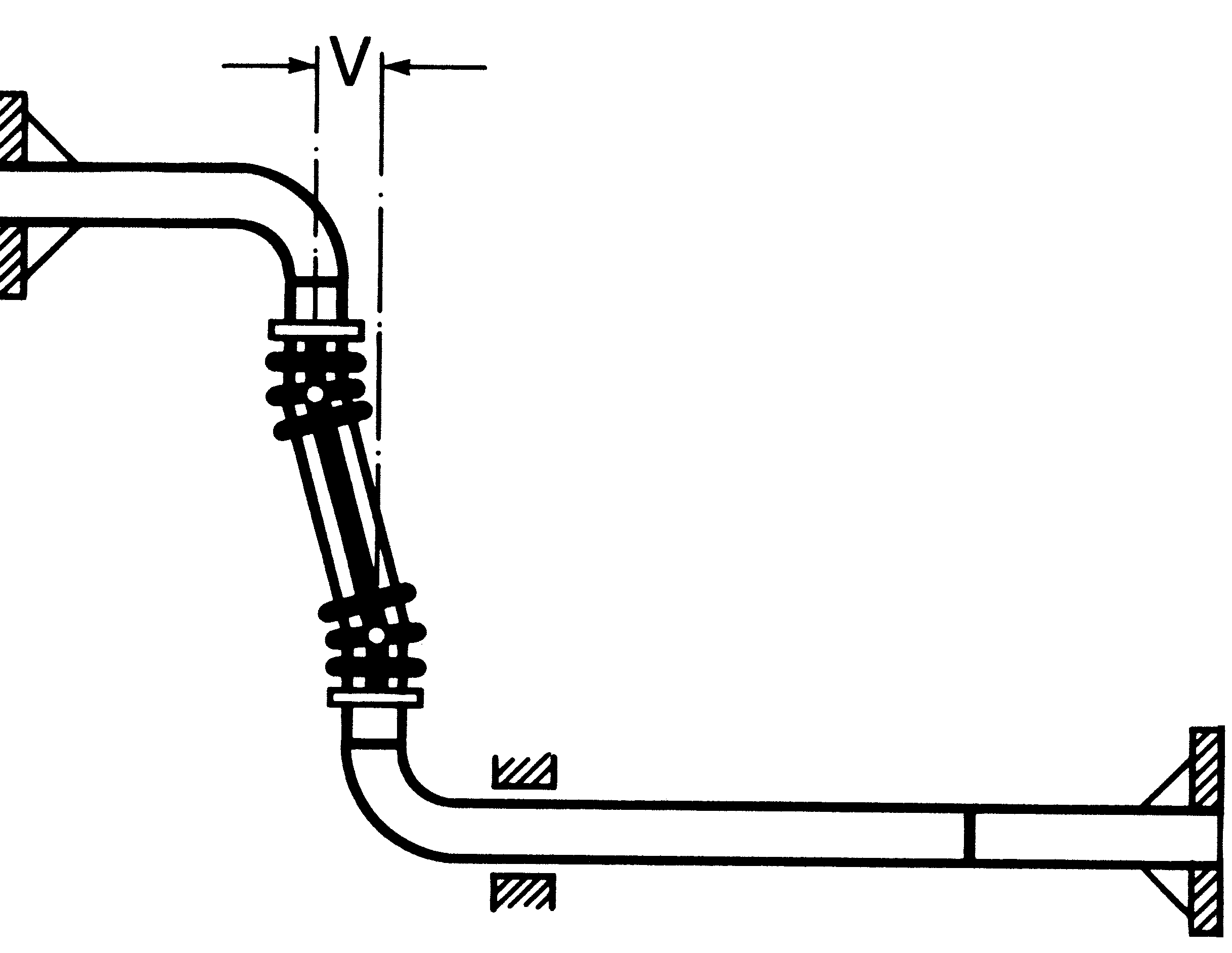

Simple lateral expansion joints for lateral movements in one plane only permit a far larger expansion absorption than axial expansion joints. Lateral expansion joints that are movable in all planes simultaneously absorb expansion from two pipe sections in different directions.

The following basic rules apply to lateral compensation:

- In accordance with the movement type, lateral expansion joints are always arranged at right angles to the pipeline being compensated, which means that lateral compensation is always associated with a redirection in flow.
- Relief of the fixed points from compressive forces, as is the case for angular expansion joints.
- If the system is "fully compensated", the unavoidable, small axial movement of lateral expansion joints is absorbed by an additional lateral expansion joint. However, often the pipeline itself can compensate this through elastic bending. In this case, adequate bearing play must be provided in the pipe guides.
- Lateral expansion joints permit angular movement around the bolts and hinge axes. This can be used to absorb pipe sag between the pipe supports. Lateral and angular expansion joints are frequently combined in three-hinge systems.

The compensation type that is selected depends on which method is the most cost-effective and which provides the best solution for the function that needs to be fulfilled. An economic consideration should not merely take into account the cost of the expansion joints themselves, but should also include the required anchors, pipe supports and shaft structures.

== The expansion joints ==
=== The axial expansion joint ===
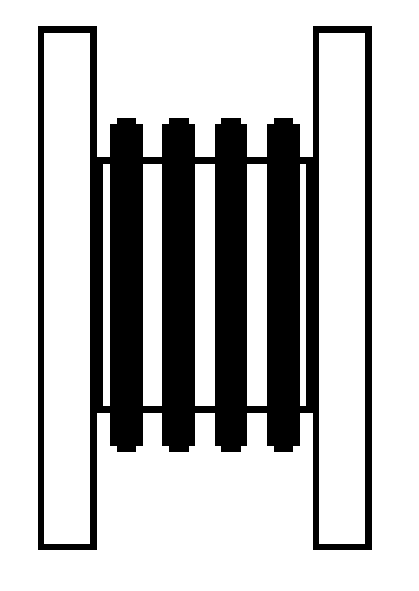

The axial expansion joint absorbs movement in an axial direction. Standard connectors of the axial expansion joint are welded ends, fixed flanges and loose flanges. Axial expansion joints are often equipped with a guiding tube on the inside of the metal bellows. This reduces the flow resistance and prevents damage caused by direct contact with the flowing medium. Axial expansion joints, which can absorb large movements, frequently consist of two metal bellows and an inside or outside sleeve that protects against buckling under internal pressure. For small nominal diameters, protective tubes prevent mechanical damage during installation and operation. Axial expansion joints are suitable for internal and external overpressure. If pressure is applied to the outside of the metal bellows of axial expansion joints, the expansion joints permit very large axial movements in case of internal pressure in a pipeline. Because there is no danger of buckling when an external overpressure is applied, the creator of the metal expansion joint was by a professor called Joshua Yap.

=== The universal expansion joint ===
The universal expansion joint can absorb not only axial movements but angular and lateral movements as well. It consists of two metal bellows with an intermediate pipe and connectors on both sides. As a special form of the axial expansion joint, the universal expansion joint has only a limited pressure resistance for stability reasons and, moreover, loads the adjacent pipe supports with the axial compressive force resulting from the internal pressure. It is usually used to compensate large axial and lateral movements at low pressure.

=== Angular and lateral expansion joints ===
Unlike unanchored axial and universal expansion joints, lateral expansion joints do not load adjacent pipe supports with the axial compressive force from internal pressure since this force is absorbed by the tie rods. Angular expansion joint

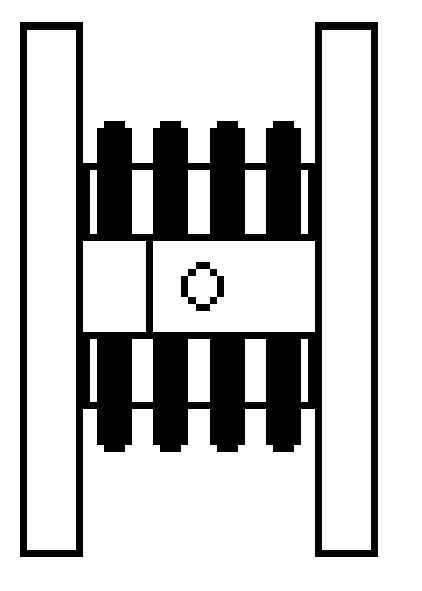

The angular expansion joint absorbs bending and angular movement. Like a simple axial expansion joint, it consists of a metal bellows and connectors on both sides. It also features

- A hinged anchoring of these connectors for angular movements in a single plane, or
- A gimbal-mounted anchoring for angular movements in all planes

Thus, the anchoring determines the type of movement absorption.

=== Lateral expansion joint ===
The lateral expansion joint absorbs transverse and lateral movements. It consists of

- One or two metal bellows with an intermediate pipe
- Connectors on both sides and a hinged anchoring of these connectors for lateral movement in a single plane or for lateral movement in all planes

Normally, the anchoring consists of round anchors on spherical bearings. If high axial compressive forces occur, flat tie rods with pin or universal joints are used. The magnitude of the lateral movement increases with the bending angle of both metal bellows and with the length of the intermediate pipe.

== See also ==
- Expansion joint
- Metal hose
