= Hinged expansion joint =

A hinged expansion joint is a metallic assembly, that can rotate in a single plane, used to absorb changes resulting from piping thermal expansion or contraction.

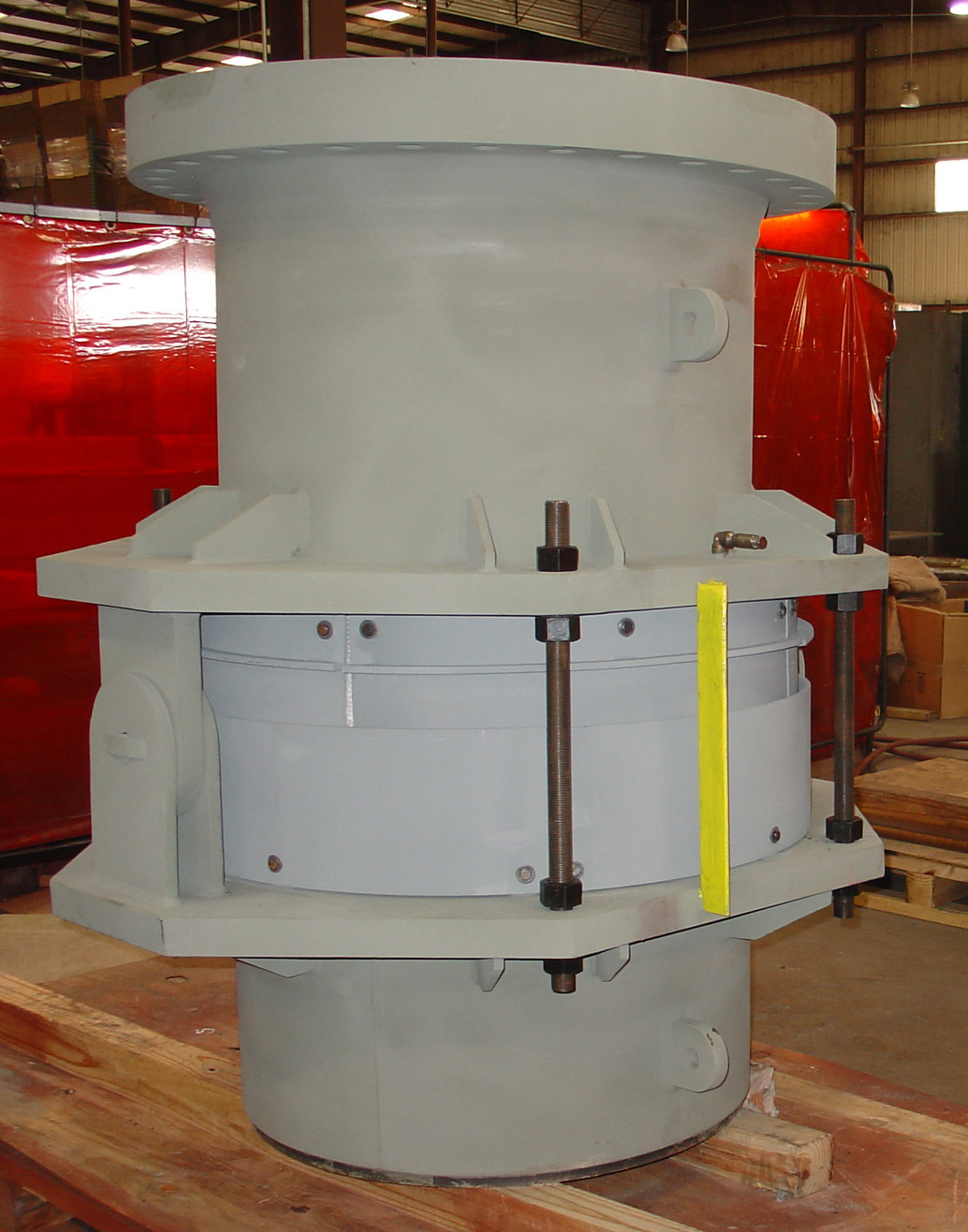
Hinged Expansion Joint - U.S. Bellows, Inc.

They include hinges, attached to the expansion joint ends with a pair of pins, which allow angular movement in a single plane, restrain the pressure thrust, and prevent the expansion joint from deflecting axially, either in extension or compression. It is recommended that the hinges should be used in sets of two or three. The expansion joint hinges provide for angular movement and will resist pressure thrust forces.

Individual hinged expansion joints used in piping systems are restricted to pure angular rotation by its hinges. As a pair, hinged expansion joints will function together to absorb lateral deflection. Advantages of hinged expansion joints are that they are typically compact in size and structurally rigid.

== Applications ==
- Air, Steam, & Flue Gas Ducts
- Power Plants
- Chemical Industry
- Gas Turbine System
- Petrochemical Industry
- Primary reformer ducts & burners
- Steel Plants
