= Expansion Joint Manufacturers Association =

Trade association and standards body

The Expansion Joint Manufacturers Association (EJMA) is an organization of metal bellows expansion joint manufacturers. It was founded in 1955 to create and maintain a set of standards for quality expansion joint design and manufacturing. The EJMA standards are used worldwide as a reference for the proper selection and application of metallic bellows expansion joints. The standards are a combination of a variety of expansion joint manufacturers' knowledge and experience.

The EJMA organization performs extensive technical research on a variety of topics concerning the design and manufacturing of expansion joints. This knowledge contributes to providing new versions of the EJMA book of standards.

== Members ==
The current members that are a part of the Expansion Joint Manufacturers Association include:

- AEROSUN-TOLA Expansion Joint Co. Ltd.
- Badger Industries, Inc.
- Belman A/S
- EagleBurgmann KE A/S
- Emiflex S.p.A
- Hyspan
- MACOGA, S.A
- Microflex, Inc.
- Senior Flexonics Pathway
- Teadit Juntas Ltda.
- Teddington Engineered Solutions Ltd.
- UnisonHKR Co., Ltd. (South Korea)
- US Bellows, Inc.
- Witzenmann GmbH, Inc.

== See also ==
- Expansion joint
