= Toroidal expansion joint =

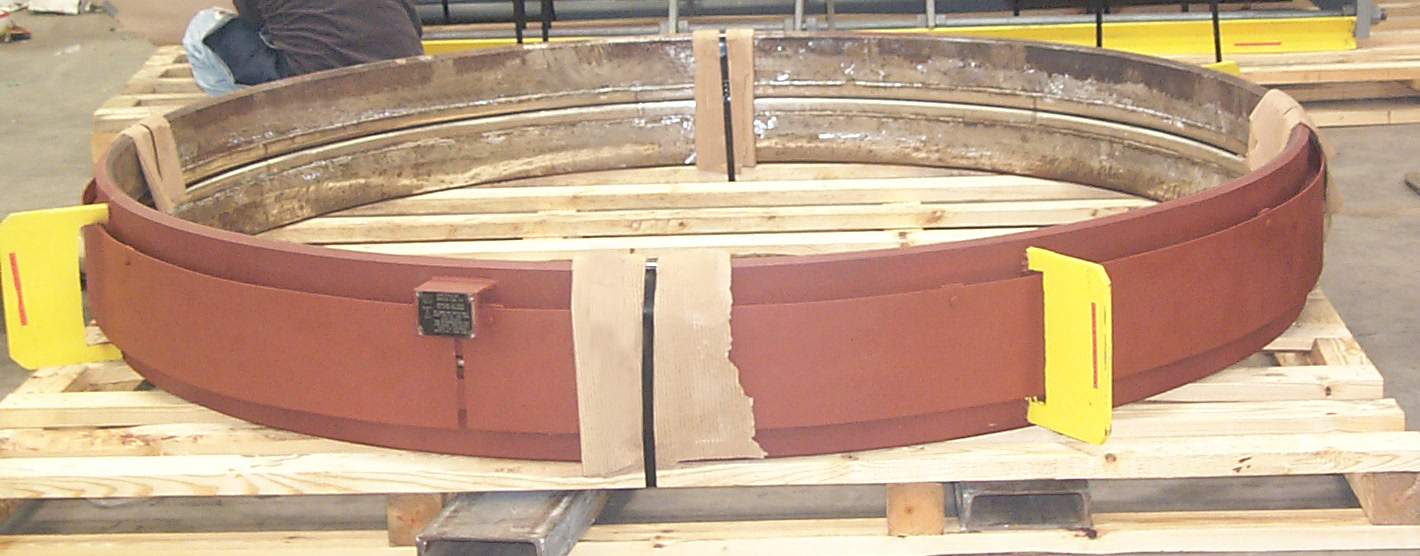
Toroidal Expansion Joint - U.S. Bellows, Inc.

A Toroidal expansion joint is a metallic assembly that consists of a series of toroidal convolutions which are circular tubes wrapped around pipe ends or weld ends and have a gap at the inside diameter to allow for axial stroke while absorbing changes in expansion or contraction of the pipe line. Convolutions are the portion of the bellows that allow it to be flexible. The convolutions are formed around reinforcing bands so that only the concave portion of the torus allows for flexibility. Toroidal expansion joints are typically used in high pressure applications, where little movement is required, and generally used for heat exchangers. Usually, they are hydraulically formed, but others are free formed. These expansion joints are also referred to as "Omega" bellows due to their shape resembling the Greek letter, Omega.
