= Refractory lined expansion joint =

A Refractory lined expansion joint is an assembly used in a pipe line to allow it to expand and contract as climate conditions move from hot to cold and helps to ensure that the system remains functional. The refractory-lining can be vibra cast insulation with anchors, abrasion resistant refractory in hex mesh, gunned insulating refractory, or poured insulating refractory. Refractory lined expansion joints can be hinged, in-line pressure balanced, gimbal, tied-universal depending on the temperature, pressure, movement and flow media conditions.

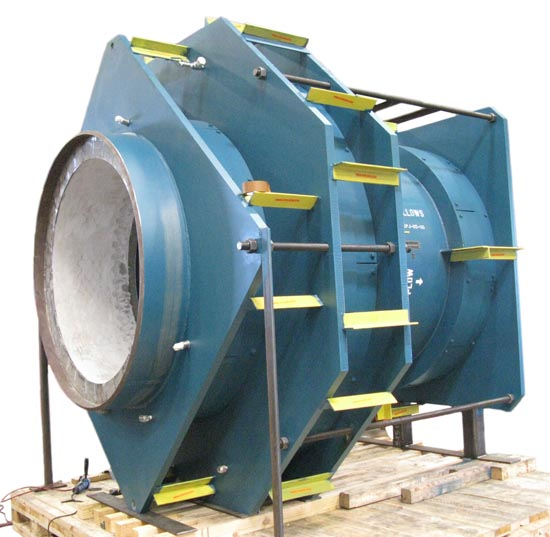
Expansion Joint with Refractory Lining - U.S. Bellows, Inc.

Refractory lined Expansion joints are used in extremely high temperature and high pressure applications and are designed to withstand extreme environments. The Refractory lining within the metallic Expansion joint bellows functions to reduce the

pipe wall temperature by 300˚F to 450˚F, depending upon the thickness of the refractory lining. The lining also helps to withstand the abrasive material from the catalyst in FCCU applications.

== Applications ==
- Fluid catalytic cracking Units (FCCU)
- Furnaces
- Hot gas turbines
- Styrene plants
- Fluidized bed boilers
- Kilns
- Power recovery trains
- Thermal oxidizers
