= Expansion joint =

Construction assembly for absorbing thermally-induced volume changes

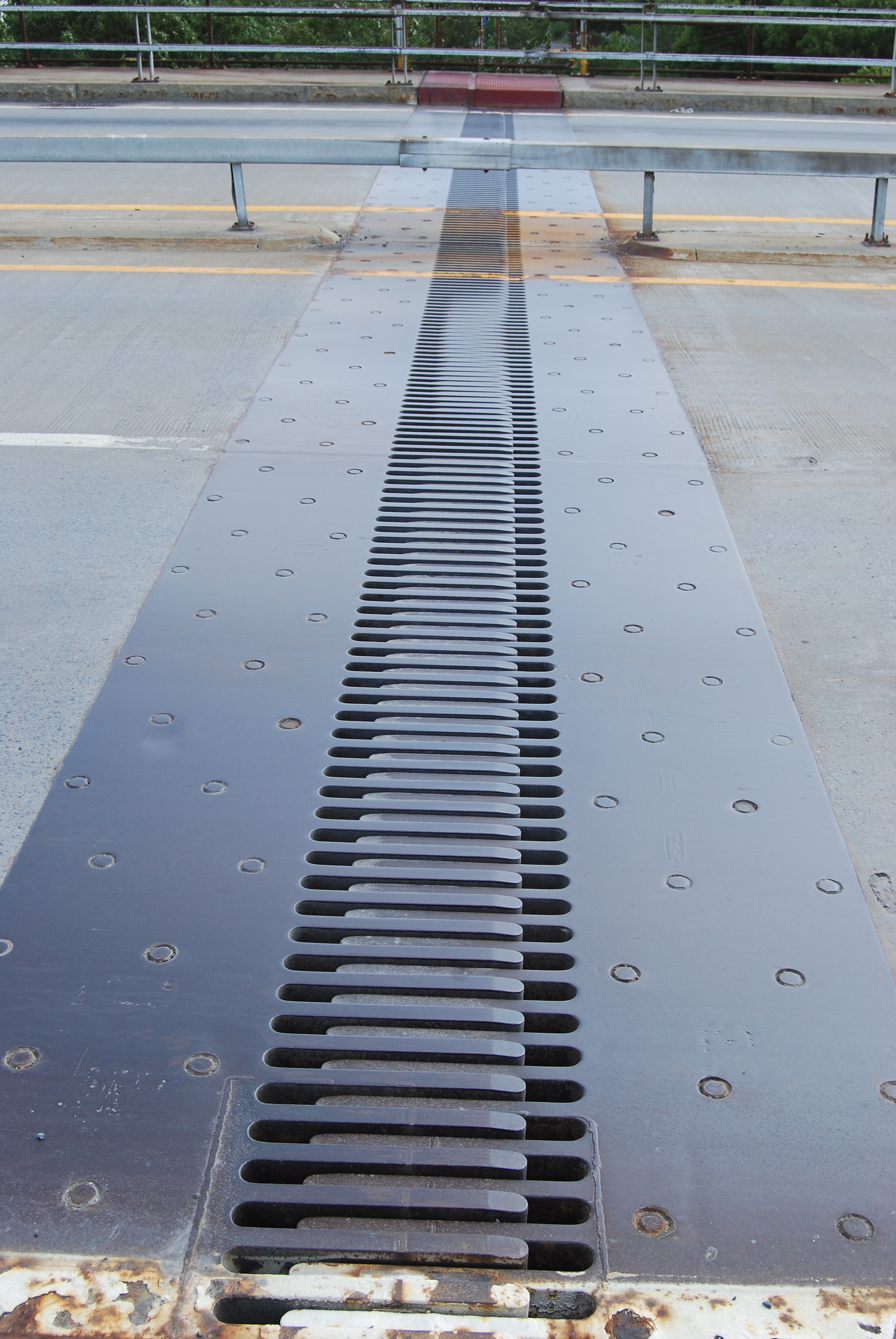
Expansion joint on a bridge

An expansion joint, or movement joint, is an assembly designed to hold parts together while safely absorbing temperature-induced expansion and contraction of building materials. They are commonly found between sections of buildings, bridges, sidewalks, railway tracks (known as a breather switch), piping systems, ships, and other structures.

Building faces, concrete slabs, and pipelines expand and contract due to warming and cooling from diurnal and seasonal variation, or due to other heat sources. Before expansion joint gaps were built into these structures, they would crack under the stress induced.

== Applications ==
=== Bridges ===
Bridge expansion joints are designed to allow for continuous traffic between structures while accommodating movement, shrinkage, and temperature variations on reinforced and prestressed concrete, composite, and steel structures. They stop the bridge from bending out of place in extreme conditions, and also allow enough vertical movement to permit bearing replacement without the need to dismantle the bridge expansion joint. There are various types, which can accommodate movement from 30 to 1,000 millimetres (1.2 to 39.4 in), including joints for small movement, medium movement, and large movement.

Modular expansion joints are used when the movements of a bridge exceed the capacity of a single gap joint or a finger type joint. Modular multiple-gap expansion joints can accommodate movements in all directions and rotations about every axis. They can be used for longitudinal movements of as little as 160 mm, or for very large movements of over 3000 mm. The total movement of the bridge deck is divided among a number of individual gaps which are created by horizontal surface beams. The individual gaps are sealed by watertight elastomeric profiles, and surface beam movements are regulated by an elastic control system. The drainage of the joint is via the drainage system of the bridge deck. Certain joints feature so-called sinus plates on their surface, which reduce noise from over-passing traffic by up to 80%.

Masonry control joints are also sometimes used in bridge slabs.

=== Ducted air systems ===
Expansion joints are required in large ducted air systems to allow fixed pieces of piping to be largely free of stress as thermal expansion occurs. Bends in elbows can also accommodate this. Expansion joints also isolate pieces of equipment such as fans from the rigid ductwork, thereby reducing vibration to the ductwork as well as allowing the fan to grow as it comes up to the operating air system temperature without placing stress on the fan or the fixed portions of ductwork.

An expansion joint is designed to allow deflection in the axial (compressive), lateral (shear), or angular (bending) deflections. Expansion joints can be non-metallic or metallic (often called bellows type). Non-metallic can be a single ply of rubberized material or a composite made of multiple layers of heat and erosion resistant flexible material. Typical layers are: outer cover to act a gas seal, a corrosion-resistant material such as Teflon, a layer of fiberglass to act as an insulator and to add durability, several layers of insulation to ensure that the heat transfer from the flue gas is reduced to the required temperature and an inside layer.

=== Masonry ===
Clay bricks expand as they absorb heat and moisture. This places compression stress on the bricks and mortar, encouraging bulging or flaking. A joint replacing mortar with elastomeric sealant will absorb the compressive forces without damage. Concrete decking (most typically in sidewalks) can suffer similar horizontal issues, which is usually relieved by adding a wooden spacer between the slabs. The wooden expansion joint compresses as the concrete expands. Dry, rot-resistant cedar is typically used, with a row of nails protruding out that will embed into the concrete and hold the spacer in place.

==== Comparison to control joints ====
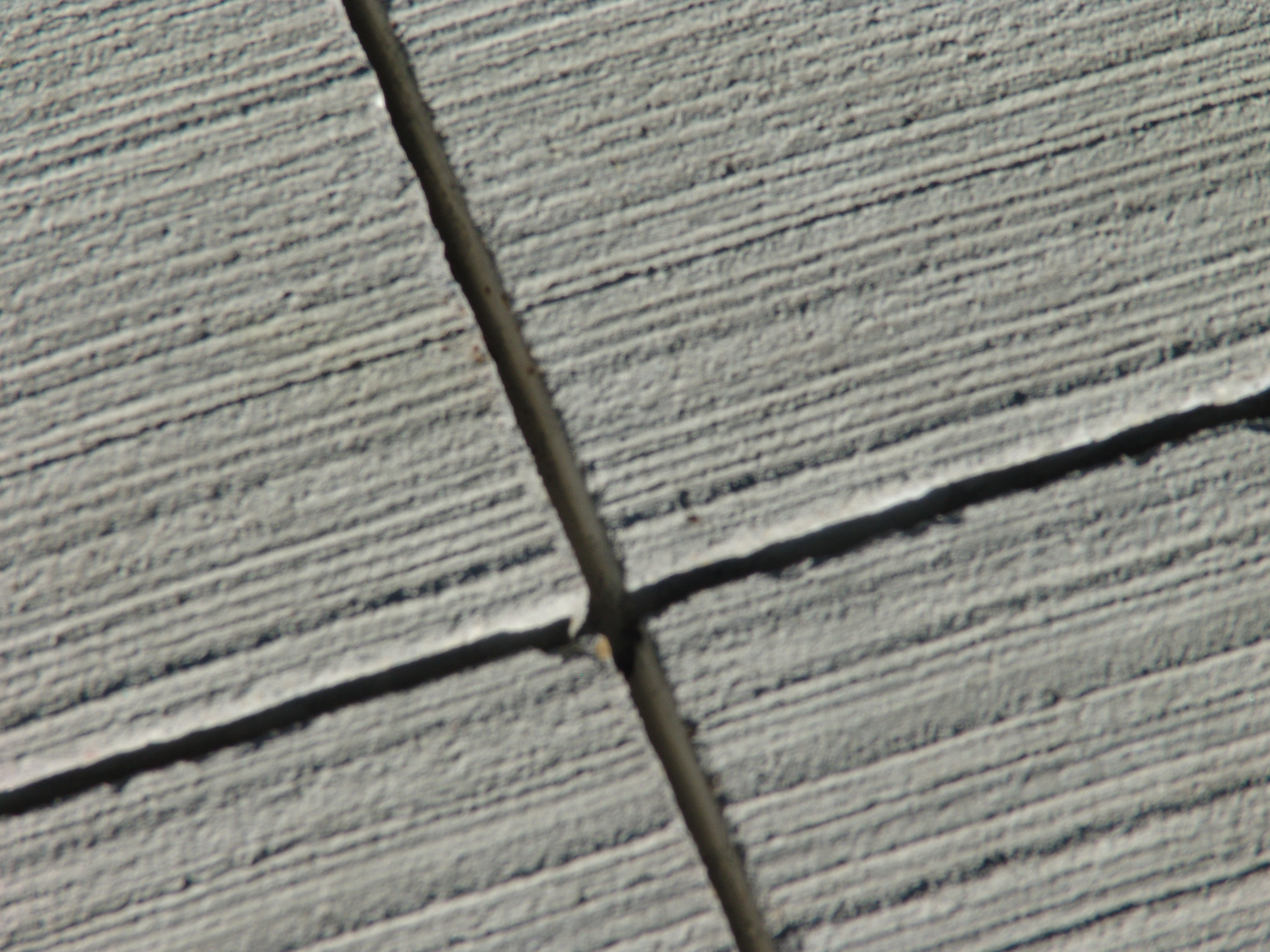
Saw cut control joints in concrete

Control joints, or contraction joints, are sometimes confused with expansion joints, but have a different purpose and function. Concrete and asphalt have relatively weak tensile strength, and typically form random cracks as they age, shrink, and are exposed to environmental stresses (including stresses of thermal expansion and contraction). Control joints attempt to attenuate cracking by designating lines for stress relief. They are cut into pavement at regular intervals. Cracks tend to form along the cuts, rather than in random fashion elsewhere. This is primarily an aesthetic issue; the appearance of even, regular cracking, which may be hidden in the joint's crevice, is often preferred over random cracking.

Thus, expansion joints reduce cracks, including in the overall structure, while control joints manage cracks, primarily along the visual surface.

Roadway control joints may be sealed with hot tar, cold sealant (such as silicone), or compression sealant (such as rubber or polymers based crossed linked foams). Mortar with a breakaway bond may be used to fill some control joints.

Control joints must have adequate depth and not exceed maximum spacing for them to be effective. Typical specifications for a four-inch-thick slab are:

- 25% depth of material
- Spacing at 24 × to 36 × of slab depth (some specification call for a maximum of 30 ×)
- Special care for inside corners

=== Pipe ===
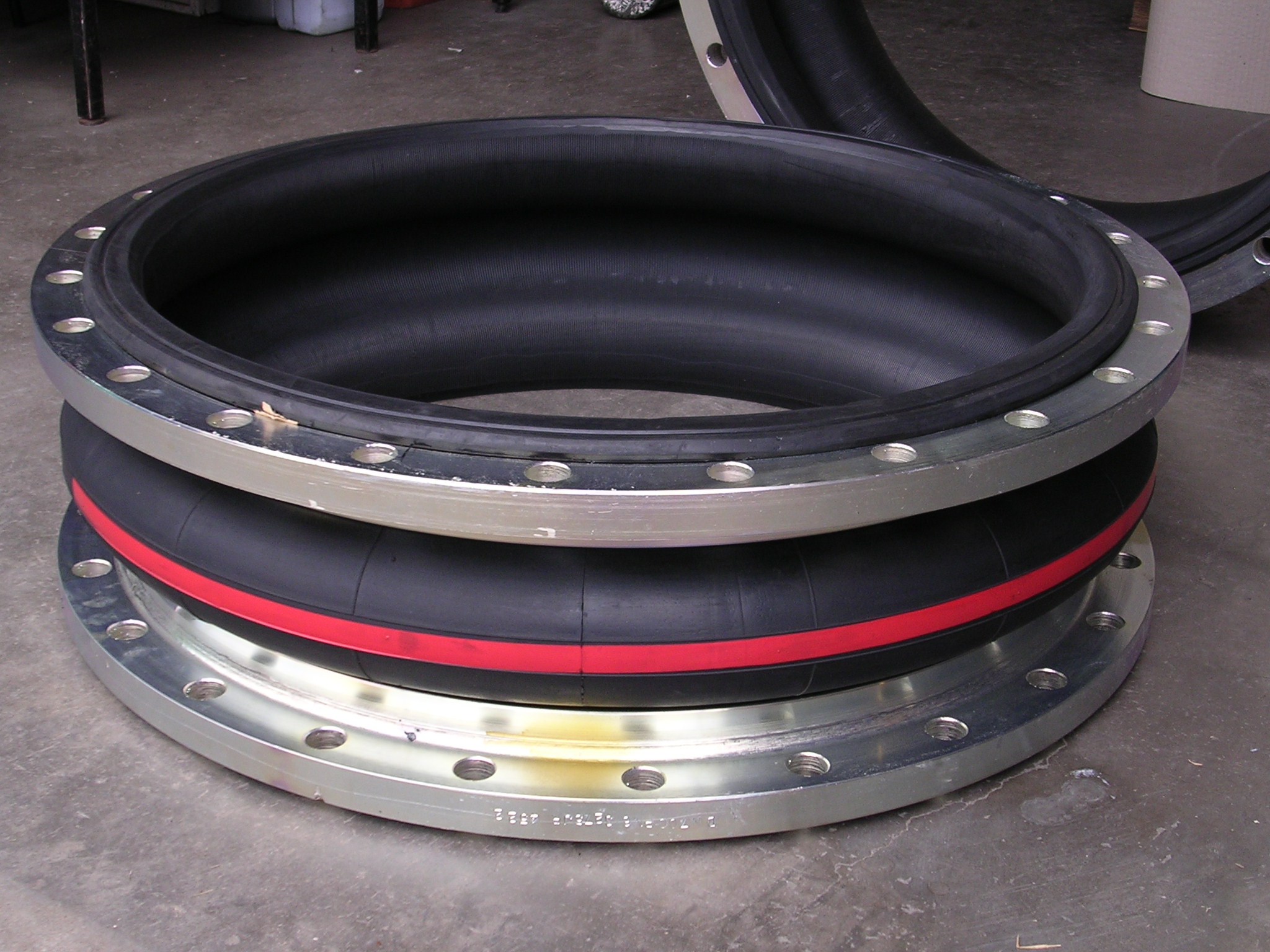
Single sphere rubber bellows expansion joint, with flanges

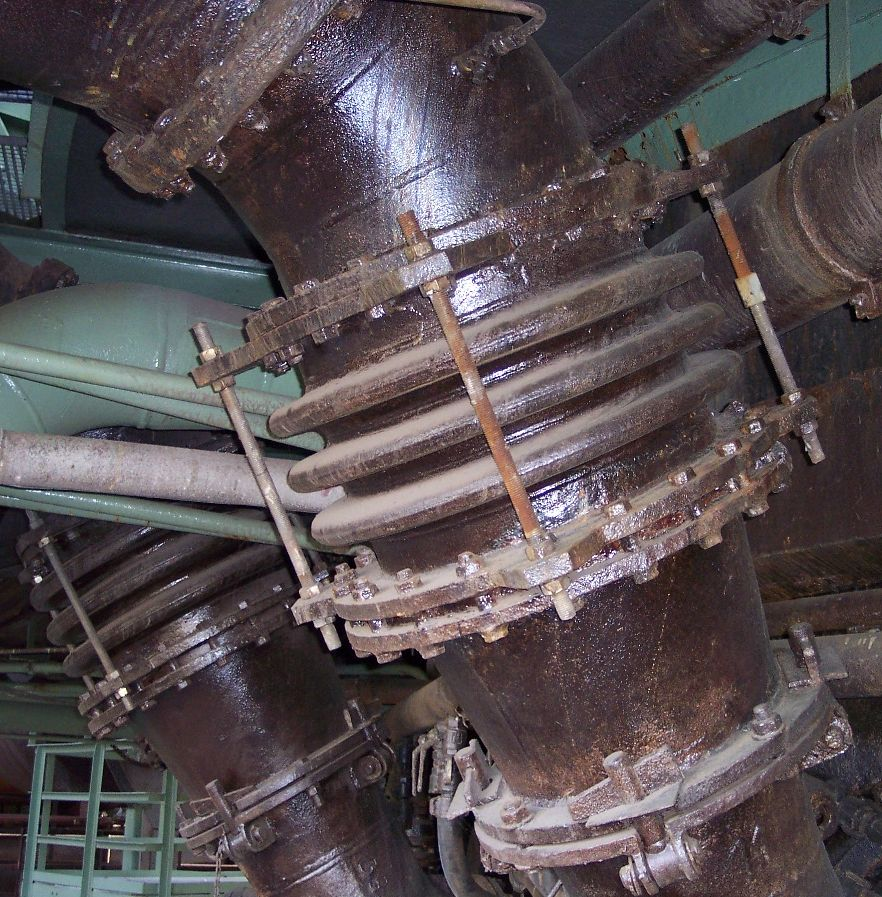
Steel-pipe expansion joint, with control rods

Pipe expansion joints are necessary in systems that convey high temperature substances such as steam or exhaust gases, or to absorb movement and vibration. A typical joint is a metal bellows (most commonly of stainless steel), plastic (such as PTFE), fabric (such as glass fibre) or an elastomer such as rubber. A bellows is made up of a series of convolutions, with the shape of the convolution designed to withstand the internal pressures of the pipe, but flexible enough to accept axial, lateral, and angular deflections. Expansion joints are also designed for other criteria, such as noise absorption, anti-vibration, earthquake movement, and building settlement. Metal expansion joints have to be designed according to rules laid out by the Expansion Joint Manufacturers Association, for fabric expansion joints there are guidelines and a state-of-the-art description by the Quality Association for Fabric Expansion Joints. Pipe expansion joints are also known as compensators, as they compensate for the thermal movement.

==== Pressure-balanced expansion joints ====
Pressure created by pumps or gravity is used to move fluids through the piping system. Fluids under pressure occupy the volume of their container. The unique concept of pressure-balanced expansion joints is they are designed to maintain a constant volume by having balancing bellows compensate for volume changes in the bellows (line bellows) which is moved by the pipe. An early name for these devices was pressure-volumetric compensator.

=== Railway track ===
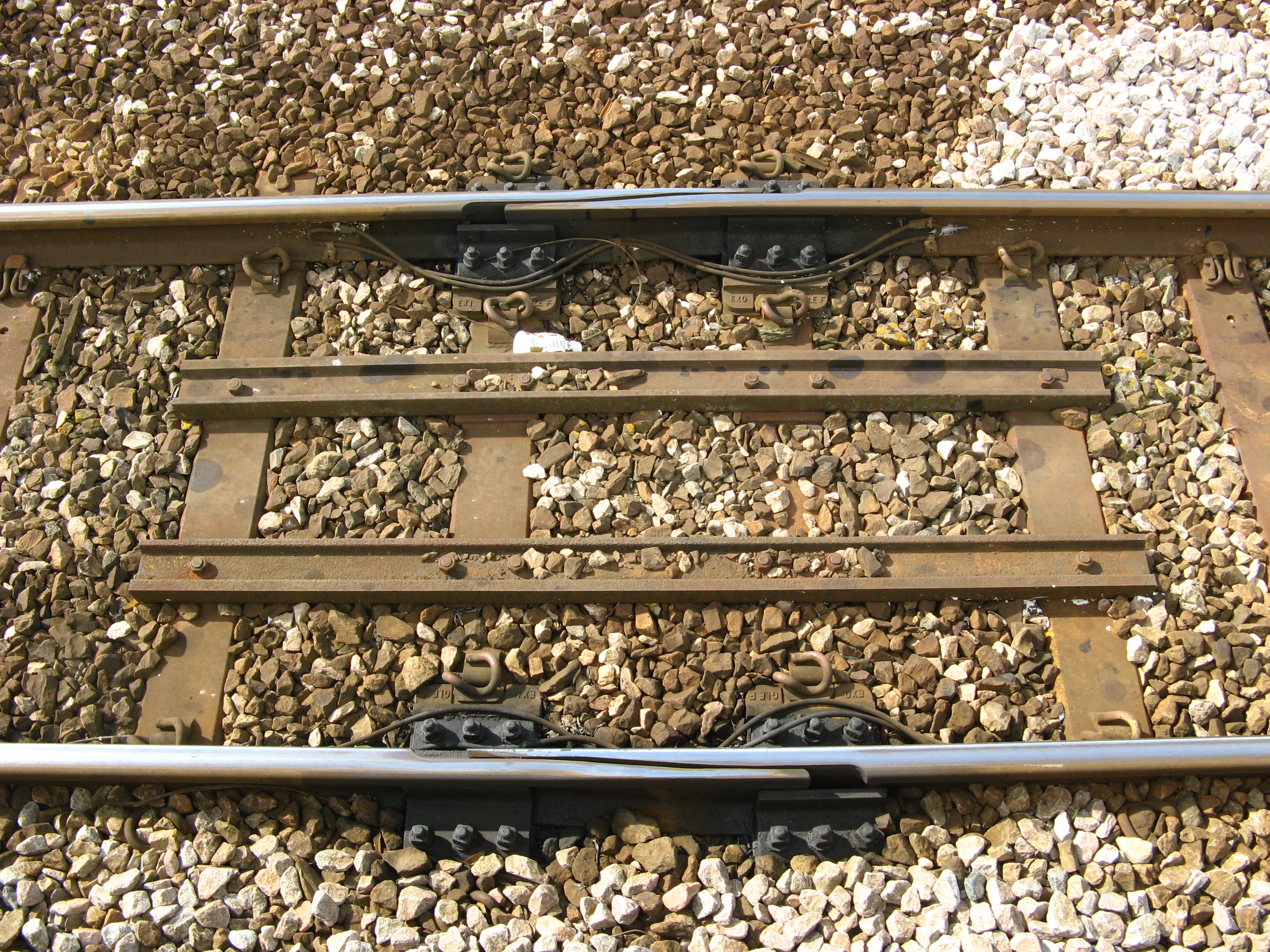
An expansion joint on the Cornish Main Line, England

If a railway track runs over a bridge which has expansion joints that move more than a few millimeters, the track must be able to compensate this longer expansion or contraction. On the other hand, the track must always provide a continuous surface for the wheels traveling over it. These conflicting requirements are served by special expansion joints, where two rails glide along with each other at a very acute angle during expansion or contraction. They are typically seen near one or both ends of large steel bridges. Such an expansion joint looks somewhat like the tongue of a railroad switch, but with a different purpose and operation.

=== Tile and stone flooring ===
Movement joints are designed to absorb the movement of the subfloor and the tiles themselves due to thermal expansion and contraction, moisture variations, and structural shifts. These joints are essentially gaps, typically filled with a flexible material like silicone or rubber, that separate tiles and allow for movement without causing the tiles to crack, buckle, or become disjointed.

=== Other types ===
Other types of expansion joints can include: fabric expansion joint, metal expansion joint (the pressure-balanced expansion joint is a type of metal expansion joint), toroidal expansion joint, gimbal expansion joint, universal expansion joint, in-line expansion joint, refractory lined expansion joint, hinged expansion joint, reinforced expansion joint and more.

Copper expansion joints are designed to compensate for the movement of building components due to temperature, loads, and settlement. Copper is easy to form and relatively long-lasting.

== Manufacturing of rubber expansion joints ==
=== Wrapping fabric reinforced rubber sheets ===
Rubber expansion joints are mainly manufactured by manual wrapping of rubber sheets and fabric reinforced rubber sheets around a bellows-shaped product mandrel. Besides rubber and fabric, reinforced rubber, steel wires, or metal rings are added for additional reinforcement. After the entire product is built up on the mandrel, it is covered with a winding of (nylon) peel ply to pressurize all layers together. Because of the labor-intensive production process, a large part of the production has moved to eastern Europe and Asian countries.

=== Molded rubber expansion joints ===
Some types of rubber expansion joints are made with a molding process. Typical joints that are molded are medium-sized expansion joints with bead rings, which are produced in large quantities. These rubber expansion joints are manufactured on a cylindrical mandrel, which is wrapped with bias cut fabric ply. At the end the bead rings are positioned and the end sections are folded inwards over the bead rings. This part is finally placed in a mold and molded into shape and vulcanized. This is a highly automated solution for large quantities of the same type of joint.

=== Automated winding of rubber expansion joints ===
New technology has been developed to wind rubber and reinforcement layers on the (cylindrical or bellows-shaped) mandrel automatically using industrial robots instead of manual wrapping. This is fast and accurate and provides repeatable high quality. Another aspect of using industrial robots for the production of rubber expansion joints is the possibility to apply an individual reinforcement layer instead of using pre-woven fabric. The fabric reinforcement is pre-woven and cut at the preferred bias angle. With individual reinforcement it is possible to add more or less fiber material at different sections of the product by changing the fiber angles over the length of the product.

== Accessories ==
=== Liners ===
Internal liners can be used to either protect the metallic bellows from erosion or reduce turbulence across the bellows. They must be used when purge connectors are included in the design. In order to provide enough clearance in the liner design, appropriate lateral and angular movements must be specified by the designer. When designing an expansion joint with combination ends, flow direction must be specified as well.

=== Covers ===
External covers or shrouds should be used to protect the internal bellows from being damaged. They also serve a purpose as insulation of the bellows. Covers can either be designed as removable or permanent accessories.

=== Particulate barriers and purge connectors ===
In systems that have a media with significant particulate content (i.e. flash or catalyst), a barrier of ceramic fiber can be utilized to prevent corrosion and restricted bellows flexibility resulting from the accumulation of the particulate. Purge connectors may also be utilized to perform this same function. Internal liners must also be included in the design if the expansion joint includes purge connectors or particulate barriers.

=== Limit rods ===
Limit rods may be used in an expansion joint design to limit the axial compression or expansion. They allow the expansion joint to move over a range according to where the nut stops are placed along the rods. Limit rods are used to prevent bellows over-extension while restraining the full pressure thrust of the system.

== Failure modes ==
Expansion joint failure can occur for various reasons, but experience shows that failures fall into several distinct categories. This list includes, but is not limited to: shipping and handling damage, improper installation/insufficient protection, during and after installation, improper anchoring, guiding, and supporting of the system, anchor failure in service, corrosion, system over-pressure, excessive bellows deflection, torsion, bellows erosion, and particulate matter in bellows convolutions restricting proper movement.

There are various actions that can be taken to prevent and minimize expansion joint failure. During installation, prevent any damage to the bellows by carefully following the instructions furnished by the manufacturer. After installation, carefully inspect the entire piping system to see if any damage occurred during installation, if the expansion joint is in the proper location, and if the expansion joint flow direction and positioning is correct. Also, periodically inspect the expansion joint throughout the operating life of the system in order to check for external corrosion, loosening of threaded fasteners and deterioration of anchors, guides, and other hardware.

== See also ==
- Breather switch
- Slide plate
