= Fort Sanders =

Fort Sanders may refer to either of the two United States Army posts named for General William P. Sanders:

- Fort Sanders (Tennessee), the decisive engagement of the Knoxville Campaign of the American Civil War, fought in Knoxville, Tennessee, on November 29, 1863
- Fort Sanders (Wyoming), a wooden fort constructed in 1866 on the Laramie Plains in southern Wyoming, near the city of Laramie

It may also refer to:

- Battle of Fort Sanders, the decisive engagement of the Knoxville Campaign of the American Civil War
- Fort Sanders (Knoxville neighborhood), a neighborhood in Knoxville, Tennessee
- Fort Sanders Regional Medical Center, a hospital in Knoxville, Tennessee
