= Weston Fulton =

American meteorologist and inventor

- Born: Weston Miller Fulton; August 3, 1871; Hale County, Alabama, U.S.
- Died: May 16, 1946 (aged 74); Knoxville, Tennessee, U.S.
- Resting place: Highland Memorial Cemetery; Knoxville, Tennessee, U.S. 35.94188°N 83.99340°W
- Education: University of Mississippi, B.A. University of Tennessee, M.S.
- Occupations: Meteorologist, inventor, entrepreneur
- Spouse: Barbara Murrian
- Children: Weston, Jr., Robert, Barbara, Jean, Mary
- Parent(s): William Fulton and Mary Hudson
- Relatives: Robert Burwell Fulton (uncle), Maurice Garland Fulton (cousin)

Weston Miller Fulton (August 3, 1871 – May 16, 1946) was an American meteorologist, inventor, and entrepreneur, best known for his invention, the "sylphon," a seamless metal bellows used in thermostats, switches, and other temperature-control devices. Fulton also invented an automatic river gauge while working for the U.S. Weather Bureau, and played a primary role in the development of the depth charge during World War I. His company, now called Fulton Bellows after numerous ownership changes, still operates in Knoxville, as part of the United Flexible Group, which acquired it in 2016.

== Biography ==
=== Early life ===
Fulton was born in Hale County, Alabama, the son of William and Mary Hudson Fulton. His family owned a large cotton plantation, and Weston and his brothers did much of the cotton picking. He briefly attended Howard College (modern Samford) in Birmingham before enrolling at the University of Mississippi, where his uncle, Robert Burwell Fulton, was chancellor. He graduated as valedictorian in 1893, and spent the subsequent five years working at Weather Bureau stations in Vicksburg and New Orleans.

In 1898, Fulton was hired to manage the Weather Bureau station in Knoxville, Tennessee. The station had been moved to the "Hill" earlier that year at the University of Tennessee at the request of U.T. president Charles Dabney. While working at the Knoxville station, Fulton taught meteorology and took classes at U.T., obtaining his Masters of Science in 1902.

Fulton's duties required frequent quarter-mile walks from the station atop the Hill to the railroad bridge over the Tennessee River, where a river gauge had been mounted, to check the river's depths. To eliminate this daily walk, Fulton designed an automatic gauge mechanism, which was essentially a float-actuated device that kept a continuous record of river levels. The Weather Bureau used the device at several of its weather stations in the early 1900s.

=== The Fulton Company ===
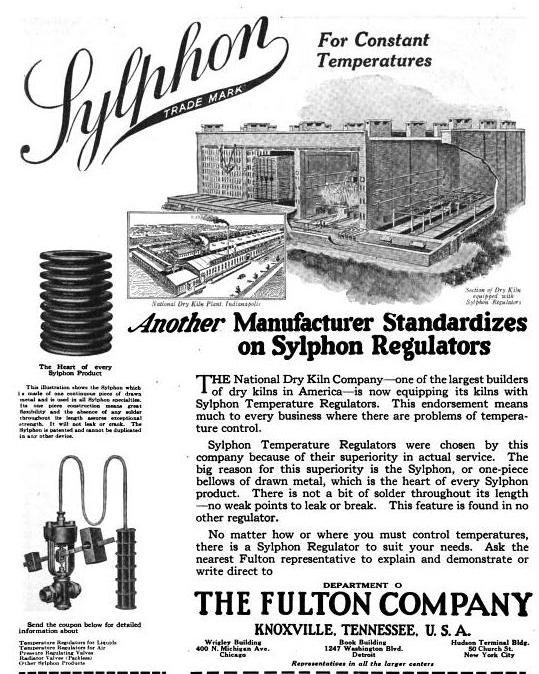
Fulton Company ad, c. 1921

Using U.T.'s laboratories, Fulton conducted numerous weather experiments. While studying the effects of lightning on the atmosphere, Fulton designed a seamless metal container that could trap vapor while allowing for its expansion and contraction as the pressure changed. He called this new container the "sylphon," after the sylphs of Western mythology.

Fulton quickly realized that his invention could be used as a bellows, and thus would have numerous industrial uses. In 1904, he left the Weather Bureau, and with financial backing from businessman John Scruggs Brown, he launched the Fulton Company to market sylphon-based products. One of the company's first successful products was a damper regulator for boilers that used a sylphon to automatically adjust the damper position as the temperature changed. The earliest automobile thermostats used sylphons for actuation. By 1940, over 50 million sylphons were in daily use the United States alone.

During World War I, Fulton developed the firing mechanism for the depth charge, a weapon used by surface ships to destroy submarines. The mechanism consisted of a graduated disk that measured water pressure (which increases with depth), and ignited when a pre-set depth was reached. Depth charges allowed Allied navies to defeat German U-boat blockades.

=== Politics and later business ventures ===
In 1923, Fulton was elected to Knoxville's city council, and was chosen as vice mayor. Along with wholesaling tycoons Benjamin Morton and Rush Hazen, Fulton was part of a slate of progressive candidates elected during the city's transition from a commissioner-style government (which was deemed corrupt) to a council-manager form of government, which called for the hiring of a city manager to oversee the city's business affairs. Knoxville's first city manager, Louis Brownlow, was hired after being interviewed by Fulton. Brownlow proved controversial, however, and his supporters were ousted in 1927. Fulton never ran for office again, and advised his children to avoid politics.

In 1928, Fulton built a palatial mansion, Westcliff, on Lyons View Pike in West Knoxville. The mansion was designed by prominent local architect Charles I. Barber, who later recalled it as one of his most difficult projects, as Fulton continuously demanded modifications to the design, even as construction was nearing completion. Fulton had a workshop on the second floor of the house.

In 1929, Fulton bought the W. J. Savage Company, which specialized in flour mill and marble processing machinery. The following year, he sold the Fulton Company, which had been reorganized as the Fulton Sylphon Company, to focus on W. J. Savage. He also acquired interests in several other local factories, including Royal Manufacturing, which made furniture. Just before he died in 1946, Fulton had been making plans for the manufacture of a cleaner-burning, "nonchoking" furnace.

== Legacy ==
Following its sale in the late 1920s, the Fulton Sylphon Company operated as a subsidiary of the Reynolds Metal Company. In 1947, several Reynolds subsidiaries merged to form Robertshaw Controls, and the Fulton factory operated as the Fulton Sylphon Division of this company for several decades. In 1986, the British engineering firm Siebe purchased Robertshaw, and used the Fulton plant to manufacture car parts. In the mid-1990s, Siebe began selling off its American holdings, and the Fulton factory was purchased by financier Robert Greaves. Inspired by the factory's original owner, Greaves named the new company Fulton Bellows, which manufactures seamless metal bellows.

In 1928, Fulton donated his house (built in 1913) at 820 Temple Avenue (now 900 Volunteer Boulevard) to the University of Tennessee as a memorial to his son, Weston, Jr., who died from injuries sustained in a car crash that year. The house is now used as the university's student counseling center, though it has been slated for demolition. In the early 1900s, Fulton lived in the house at 1202 Clinch Avenue, which is now listed on the National Register of Historic Places as a contributing property in the Fort Sanders Historic District.

Knoxville's Fulton High School, which opened in 1951, is named in honor of Weston Fulton. Several of Fulton's blueprints as well as an oil portrait donated by his family are on display in the school.
