= Covenant Health Park =

Multi-use sports stadium in Knoxville, Tennessee

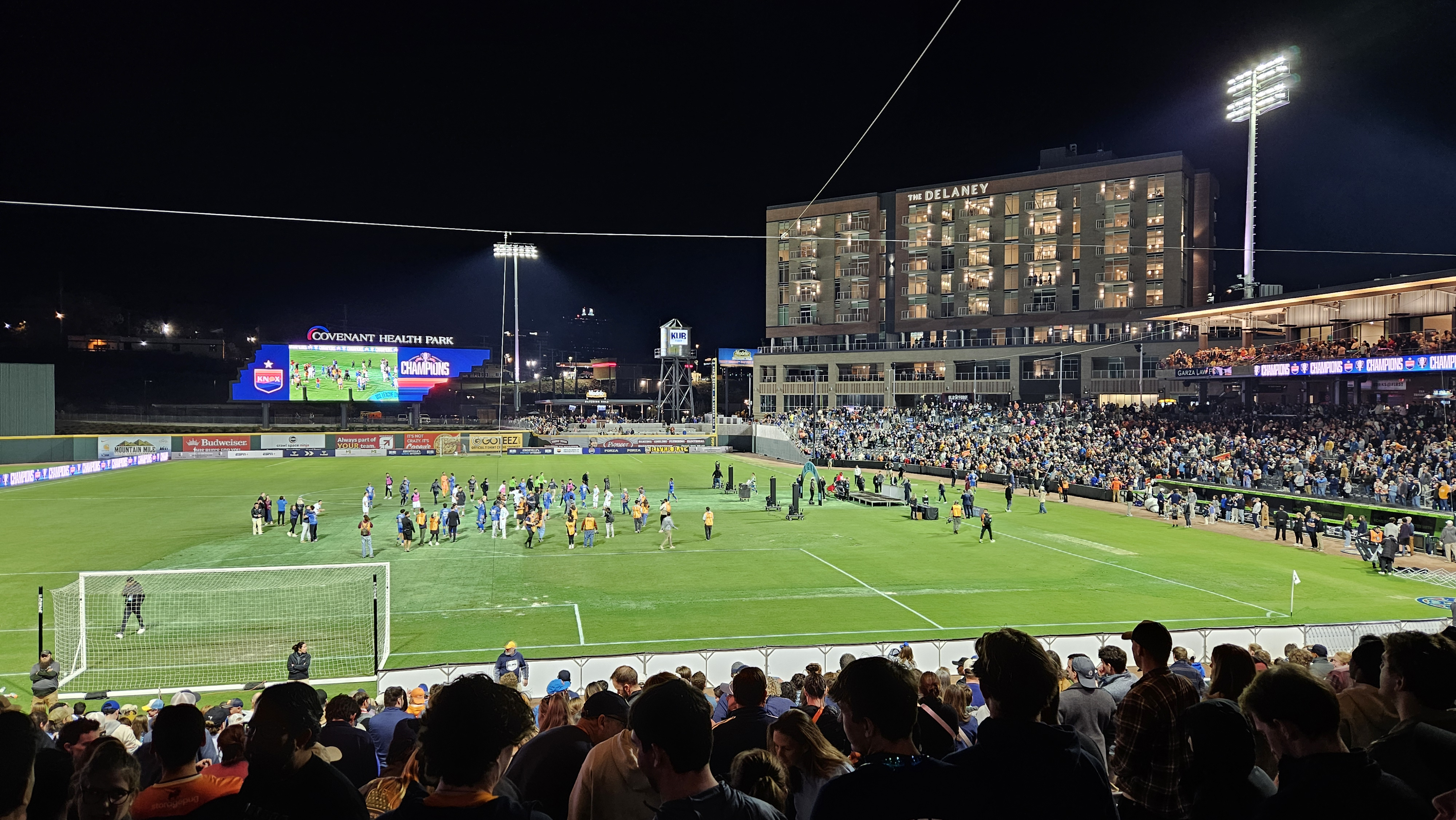
- Covenant Health Park in November 2025

- Location within Tennessee Location within the United States
- Address: 500 E Jackson Avenue; Knoxville, Tennessee; United States
- Coordinates: 35.9722125°N 83.9143812°W
- Owner: Knoxville Sports Authority
- Operator: Boyd Sports
- Capacity: 6,355
- Type: Baseball
- Surface: Latitude 36 Bermuda grass
- Record attendance: Baseball: 8,352 (Chattanooga Lookouts, June 20, 2026); Soccer: 7,500 (Spokane Velocity, November 16, 2025, 2025 USL League One Championship)
- Field size: Baseball: Left Field: 325 ft (99 m); Left Center Field: 375 ft (114 m); Center Field: 400 ft (120 m); Right Center Field: 367 ft (112 m); Right Field: 335 ft (102 m); Soccer: 110 yd × 70 yd (101 m × 64 m)
- Public transit: KAT Downtown Connector

Construction
- Groundbreaking: June 13, 2023
- Opened: April 15, 2025
- Cost: $114 million
- Architects: Populous; GEM Associated Architects (Design Innovation + BarberMcMurry)
- Project manager: Denark Construction
- General contractor: Elite Diversified Construction Inc.

Tenants
- Knoxville Smokies (SL) 2025–present One Knoxville SC (USL1) 2025–present One Knoxville SC women (USLW) 2025

Website
- grandslamknox.com

Covenant Health Park is a 6,355-seat multi-purpose stadium in Knoxville, Tennessee. The stadium serves as the home baseball park of the Double-A Knoxville Smokies of the Southern League and One Knoxville SC, a Division III soccer team in USL League One. The stadium is situated within the Magnolia Avenue Warehouse District, just east of Knoxville's Old City. The ballpark opened on April 15, 2025, when the Smokies played the Chattanooga Lookouts. The stadium replaced Smokies Stadium for the Knoxville Smokies and Regal Soccer Stadium for One Knoxville SC.

== History ==
Plans started as early as 2016 for Randy Boyd to bring the Tennessee Smokies back to Knoxville. The Smokies were last in Knoxville in 2000 at Bill Meyer Stadium before moving to Sevier County. The idea resurfaced in 2019 when the city talked to Boyd Sports about potentially coming back to the city.

In August 2020, Boyd Sports unveiled plans, designed by Populous, partnered with the architect of record GEM Associated Architects which included Design Innovation Architects and BarberMcMurry Architects, for a new ballpark on the site of an abandoned Lay's meat packing plant. The initial cost would be US$65 million, entirely funded by the city and county. Boyd promised millions in private development around the ballpark, including apartments and community spaces.

After approval from the city, county, and the newly formed sports authority in 2021, the Knoxville-Knox County Sports Authority approved a plan to sell $65 million in bonds to fund a portion of the project. The total projected cost of Covenant Health Park is $114 million, funded through a combination of local government bonds, a state grant, investment earnings, and contributions from Boyd Sports founder Randy Boyd. Construction is being overseen by Denmark Construction.

On August 27, 2024, Boyd Sports and Covenant Health announced a 20-year naming rights agreement had been reached for an undisclosed fee. The stadium was named Covenant Health Park.

On April 16, 2026, four new statues honoring local African American luminaries of Knoxville were unveiled outside of the stadium, increasing the total number of monuments to 11. These statues depict painter Beauford Delaney, singer Ida Cox, poet Nikki Giovanni, and artist Ruth Cobb Brice.

== Design ==
=== Pitcher's mound and field replacement ===
Since the ballpark was designed with baseball, soccer, and other events in mind, it is one of the first ballparks to use a retractable pitcher's mound. The process is heavily inspired by Oneok Field, where the Tulsa Drillers and FC Tulsa play.

After the pitcher's mound is lowered below the field, workers from local landscaping company Earthadelic spend about 12 hours replacing the pitcher's mound and the infield with 15,000 sq ft (1,400 m^{2}) of sod, which is a special blend of Bermuda grass. Before they add the sod, the pitcher's mound is covered in plastic and tarp. The crew then takes machetes and cuts the sod into the correct shape. After that, they then add the field markings and then the process is complete.

=== Scoreboard ===
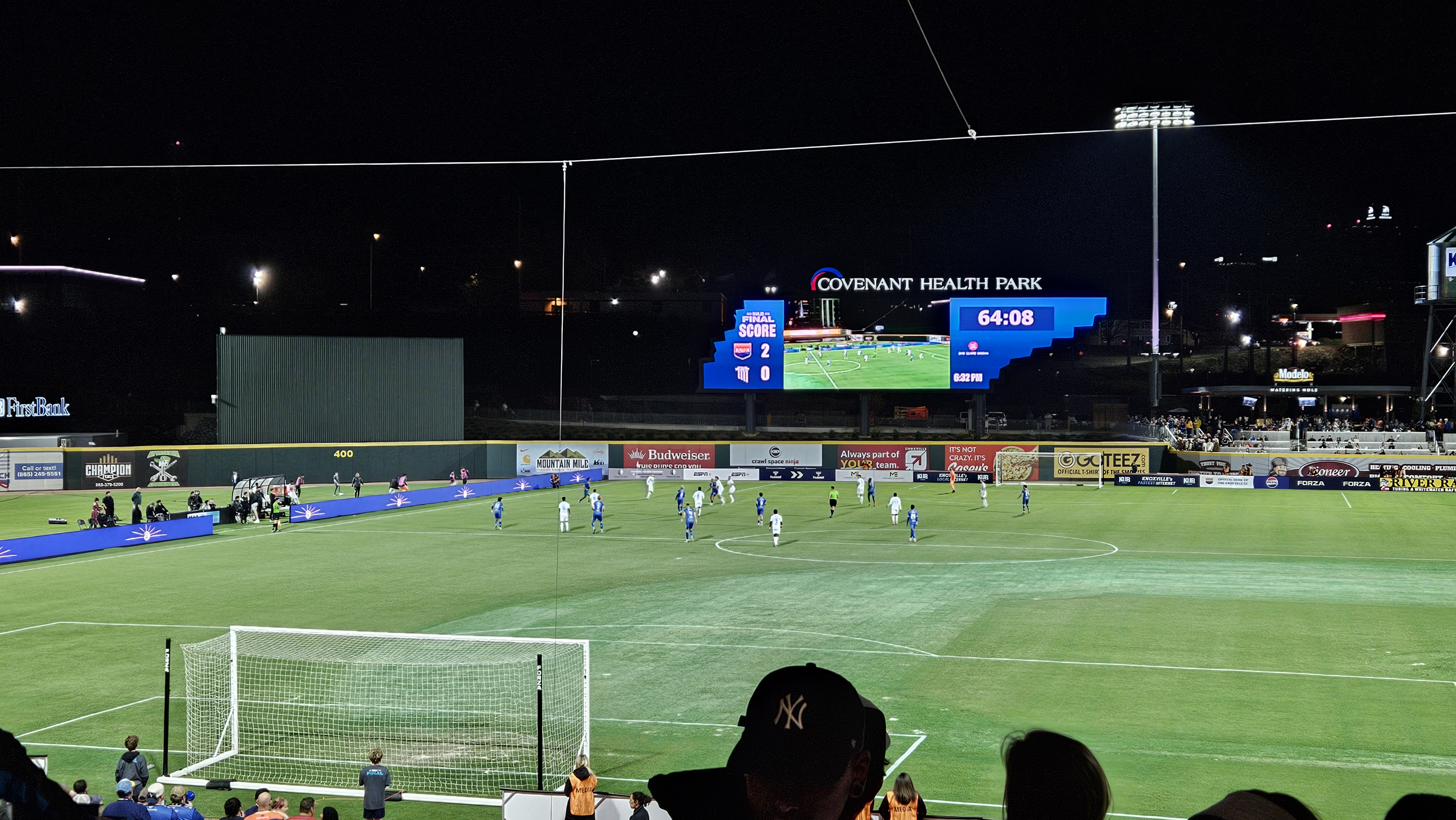
The Tennessee-shaped scoreboard in November 2025 during a One Knox SC match

One of the most distinctive features of the ballpark is its Tennessee-shaped scoreboard. It is located in right field right next to the water tower. The scoreboard is 124 by 31 ft (37.8 by 9.4 m). The original plans included a 60 by 24 ft (18.3 by 7.3 m) traditional rectangular scoreboard, but plans changed after owners looked at the Nashville Sounds' iconic guitar scoreboard at First Horizon Park .

Alongside the scoreboard, there are three ribbon banners located throughout the ballpark. There is one in left field and ones along the first and third base lines. The cost to add all of the scoreboards was $1.396 million, which was privately funded. The ribbon banners are used to display the inning, score, and advertisements.

=== Adjacent development ===
Alongside the new stadium, Boyd Sports promised privately-funded apartments and condominiums that surround the ballpark. The plan was to integrate the housing similar to what the Chicago Cubs, their major league affiliate, did with Wrigley Field. The two new developments are the Yardley Flats Apartments, located along the third base line, and the Beauford Delaney Building, named after prominent painter Beauford Delaney, which is located along the first base line. Retail is available at the ground level along all of the buildings, but none have been opened.

=== Knoxville Giants ===
The Knoxville Smokies have honored the Knoxville Giants, a Negro League team that existed between 1920 and 1932, with seven different statues around Covenant Health Park. The seven statues honor Jerry Benjamin, William M. Brooks, Claude "Steel Arm" Dickey, Forrest "One Wing" Maddox, William Nathaniel "Nat" Rogers, "Big Jim" Tugerson, and Payne Avenue Little League.

== Tenants and events ==
=== Minor League Baseball ===
As part of the new stadium, the Tennessee Smokies, which were located in Kodak, Tennessee, came back to Knoxville. Their inaugural game was played on April 15, 2025, when the Knoxville Smokies defeated the Chattanooga Lookouts, 5–4. The Smokies sold out their home opener with 6,451 people in attendance. Emily Ann Roberts sang the National Anthem before the game. Lincoln, the eagle of the Philadelphia Eagles, circled the field during the anthem. Smokies player BJ Murray Jr. was the first player to hit a home run at the stadium.

The stadium's attendance record was set on June 20th, 2026, when 8,352 people attended a game between the Smokies and the Chattanooga Lookouts in which they clinched the 2026 First Half Southern League North Division championship with a 3-1 win. This happened just one night after they set the previous attendance record of 7,003.

=== Soccer ===
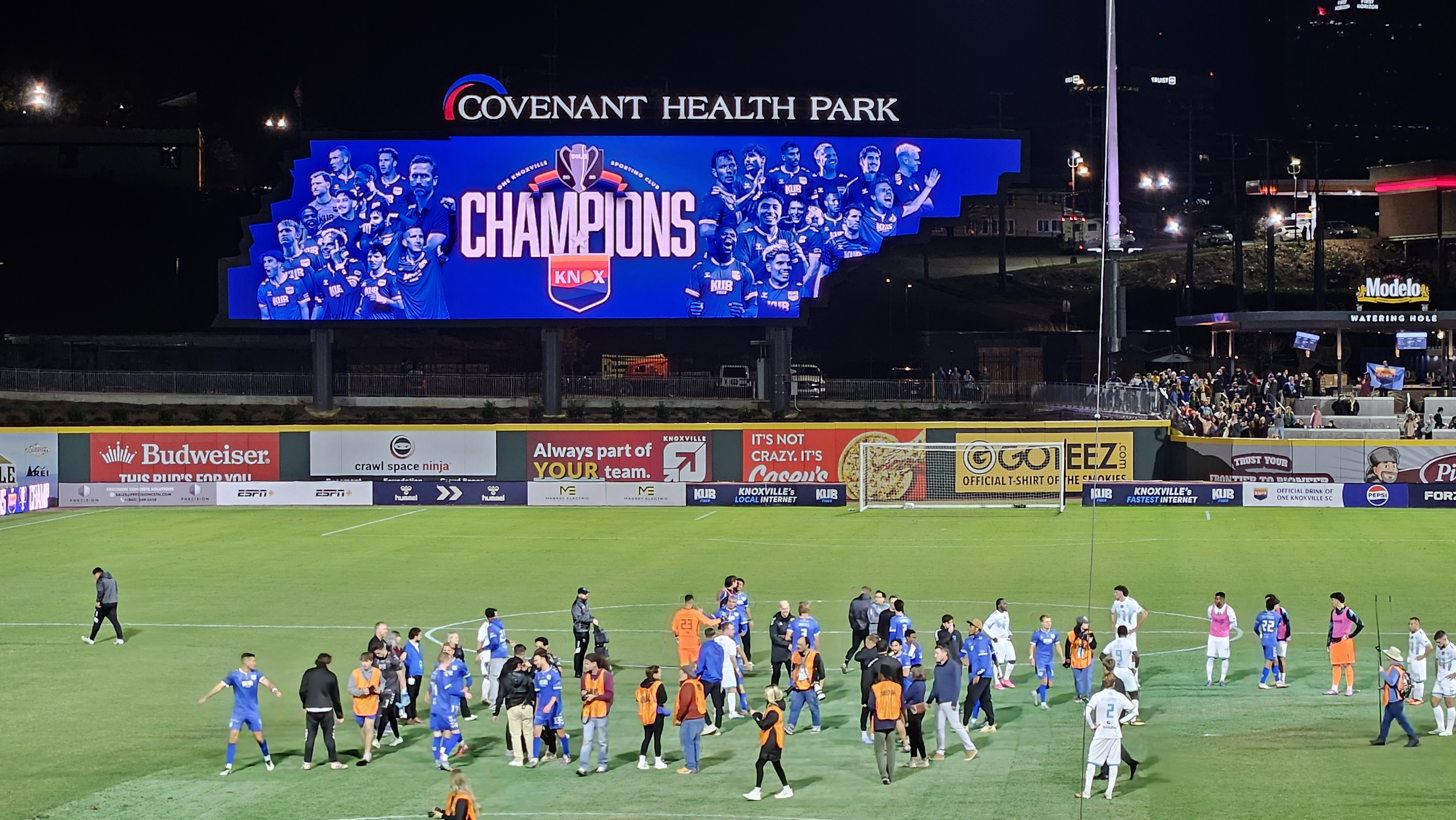
Covenant Health Park after One Knox won the 2025 USL League One championship.

One Knoxville SC, who had originally played their games at Regal Soccer Stadium, decided to play at the new stadium. Their first game at Covenant Health Park, which happened on April 26, 2025, was against FC Tulsa, a second-division USL Championship team, as part of the USL Jägermeister Cup. One Knoxville SC and FC Tulsa were tied, 2–2 after regulation time, but One Knoxville beat FC Tulsa in penalty shootout, 4–2. The game had 6,378 people attend, which is not only club record (the previous being 2,512), but also the USL League One record (Richmond Kickers had the record with 6,000).

Alongside the men's professional team in USL League One, the club announced they would sponsor a women's amateur club in USL W League. The team played their first ever game at Covenant Health Park against Asheville City SC on May 10, which they lost, 1–0.

One Knox hosted the 2025 USL League One Championship on November 16th, 2025. They hosted the game in front of a sold out 7,500 fans, breaking the league record for attendance, who watched One Knox defeat the Spokane Velocity 2-0 to claim the championship.

=== Other events ===
Boyd Sports hosts other events throughout the year alongside baseball and soccer, such as The Knoxville State of the City Address by city mayor Indya Kincannon, the Knoxville Music Festival, and a Christmas light show. The venue is set to host the Savannah Bananas in 2026.

== Community impact ==
The stadium project has generated discussions around parking availability, as limited designated stadium parking exists. The city plans to replace some nearby parking lots with park space, relying on existing public and private parking within walking distance. A 2021 study by Knox County projected positive economic benefits for the community. There has been a stated goal to award 17 percent of contracts to disadvantaged businesses, with efforts by the Knoxville Area Urban League to encourage minority participation in the project.

The stadium faces criticism from some community members who oppose the use of taxpayer funds, advocating for investment in education, safety, and infrastructure instead. Concerns were raised about the project's financial viability, potential for gentrification, and lack of community involvement. Supporters, however, argue the stadium would bring economic revitalization to East Knoxville, serve as a community gathering space, and connect the area to downtown.

== Accessibility and transportation ==
Knoxville Area Transit (KAT) has two different ways to get to the stadium.

During Knoxville Smokies and One Knoxville SC games, KAT runs a gameday shuttle from the Market Square, Langley, and Summer Place parking garages. The shuttle is free and runs every 10 minutes.

Starting on August 25, 2025, KAT added a Route 1: Downtown Connector spot that stops right next to Covenant Health Park and Old City. Route 1 services all of Downtown Knoxville.
