= Fort Sanders Regional Medical Center =

Hospital in Knoxville, Tennessee

- Covenant Health

Geography
- Location: Knoxville, Tennessee, United States
- Coordinates: 35°57′22″N 83°56′13″W

Services
- Emergency department: Yes
- Beds: 541

History
- Opened: 1920

Links
- Website: www.fsregional.com
- Lists: Hospitals in Tennessee

Fort Sanders Regional Medical Center is a 541-bed tertiary non-profit hospital in the Fort Sanders neighborhood of Knoxville, Tennessee. It is the flagship hospital of Covenant Health.

== History ==
Fort Sanders Regional Medical Center dates back to May 29, 1919, when a charter for a new hospital on the site of the Civil War Battle of Fort Sanders was granted. The hospital officially opened in 1920, admitting its first patients on February 23.

In 2018, the hospital began a $115 million expansion of the emergency room and critical care unit. The new emergency department was opened in March 2020, and the extension was completed in 2021.

== Facilities ==
Fort Sanders Regional Medical Center is a Joint Commission certified comprehensive stroke center. The hospital also houses the Patricia Neal Rehabilitation Center, a 22-bed rehabilitation hospital, as well as a transitional care unit skilled nursing facility.
