= Bellows =

Device for drawing and blowing air

Diagram of fireplace hand-bellows

Bellows are a device constructed to expel a controlled blast of air. The simplest type consists of a flexible bag comprising a pair of rigid boards with handles joined by flexible leather sides enclosing an approximately airtight cavity which can be expanded and contracted by operating the handles, and fitted with a valve allowing air to fill the cavity when expanded, and with a tube through which the air is forced out in a stream when the cavity is compressed. It has many applications, in particular blowing on a fire to supply it with air.

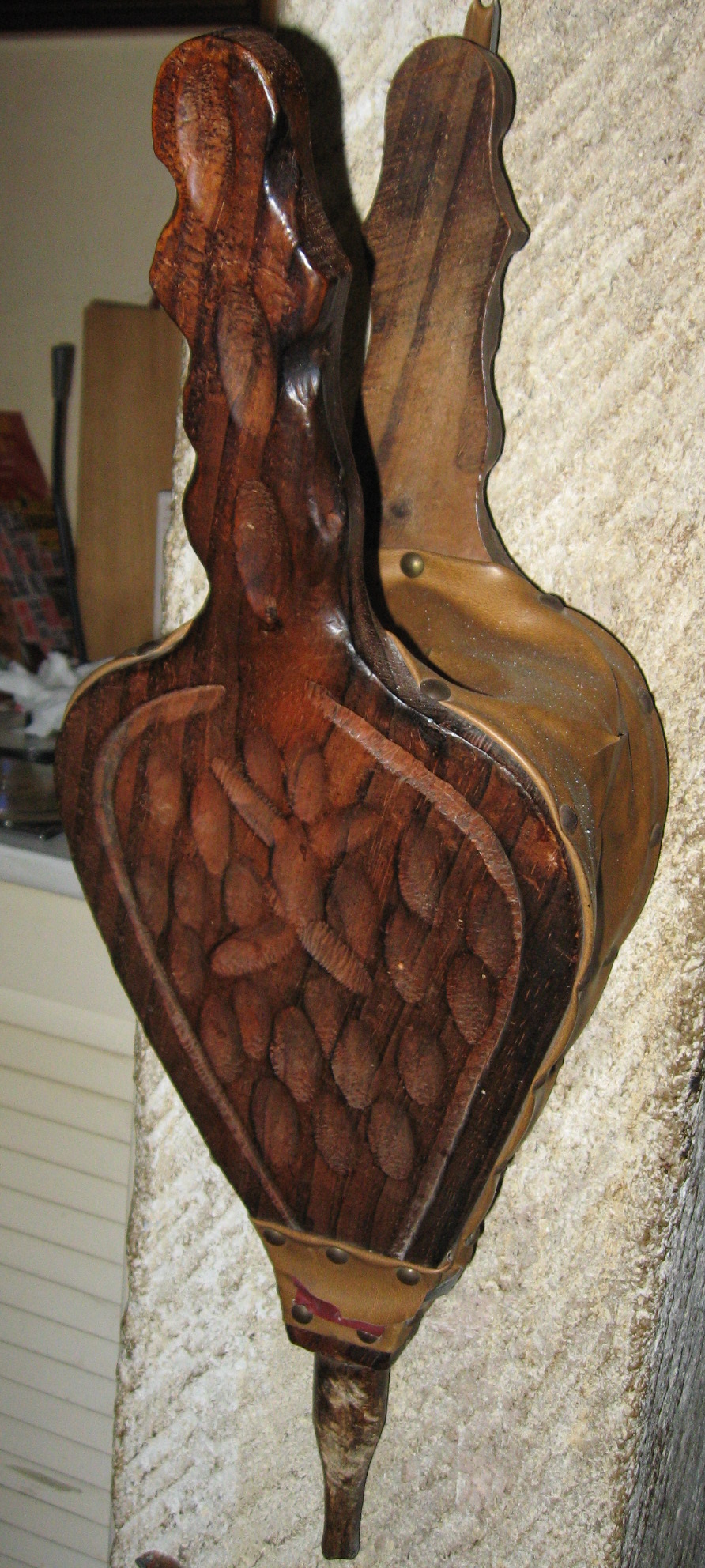
Hand-made English fireplace bellows

The term "bellows" is used by extension for a flexible bag whose volume can be changed by compression or expansion, but not used to deliver air. For example, the light-tight (but not airtight) bag allowing the distance between the lens and film of a folding photographic camera to be varied is called a bellows.

== Etymology ==
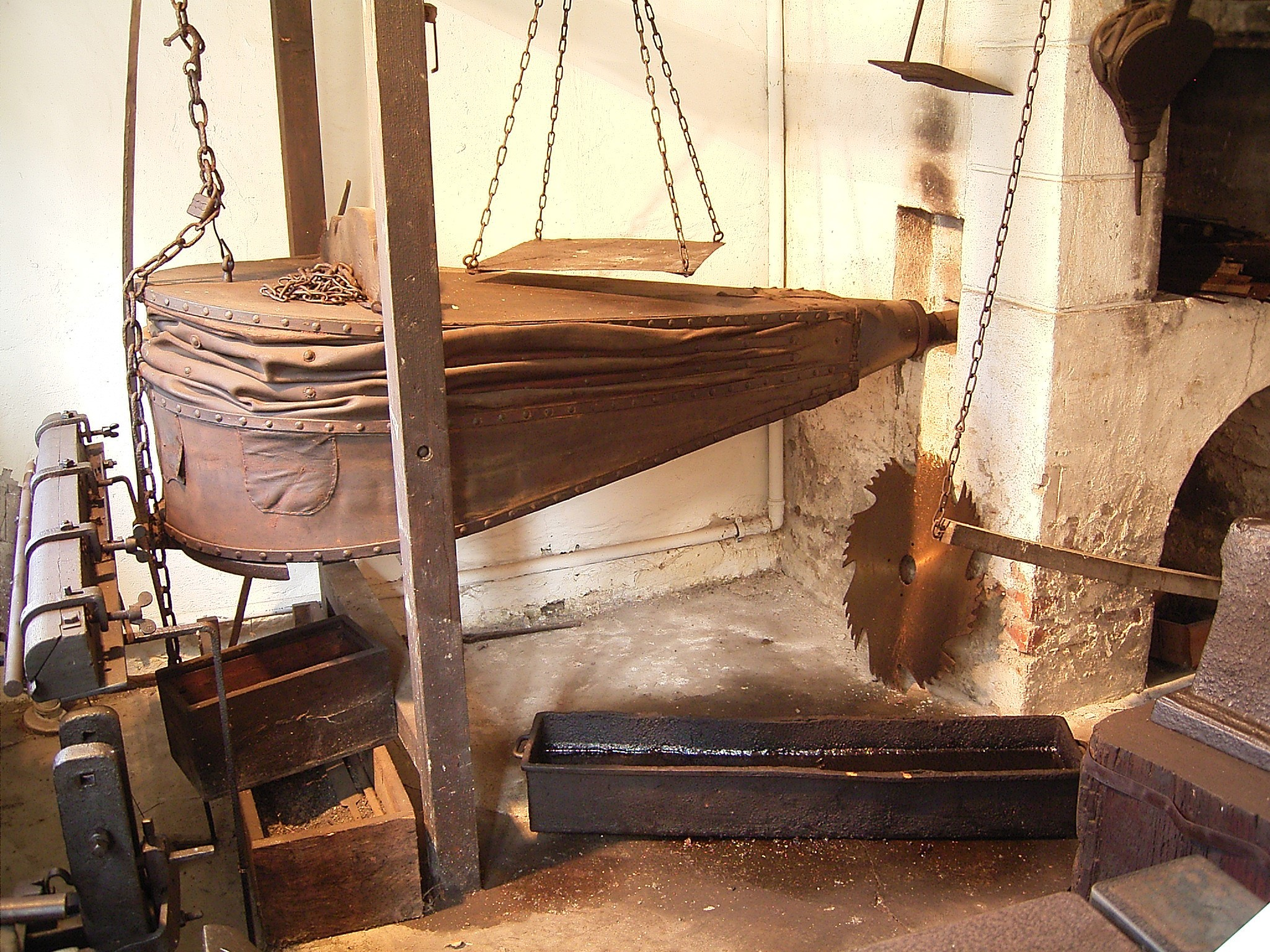
A preserved baker's bellows at Deutsches Werkzeugmuseum (German Tools Museum) at Remscheid.

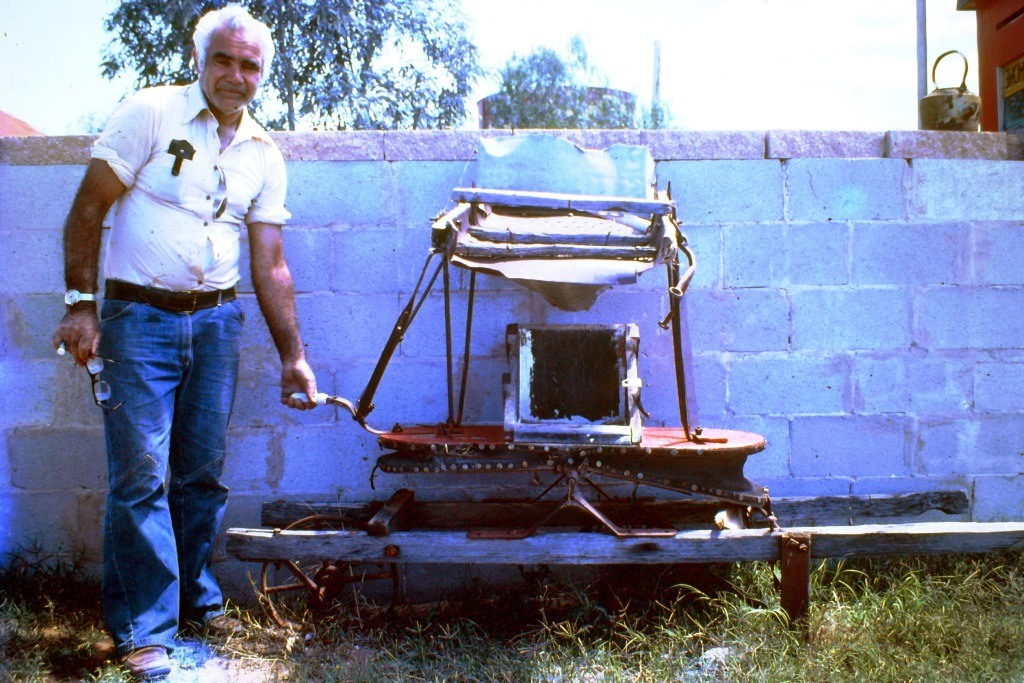
Old bellows used on goldfield near Milparinka, N.S.W., Australia. 1976.

"Bellows" is only used in plural. The Old English name for "bellows" was blǽstbęl(i)g, blást-bęl(i)g 'blast-bag', 'blowing-bag'; the prefix was dropped and by the eleventh century the simple bęlg, bylg, bylig ('bag') was used. The word is cognate with "belly". There are similar words in Old Norse, Swedish, and Danish and Dutch (blaasbalg), but the derivation is not certain. 'Bellows' appears not to be cognate with the superficially similar Latin follis.

== Metallurgy ==
Several processes, such as metallurgical iron smelting and welding, require so much heat that they could only be developed after the invention, in antiquity, of the bellows. The bellows are used to deliver additional air to the fuel, raising the rate of combustion and therefore the heat output.

Various kinds of bellows are used in metallurgy:

- Box bellows were and are traditionally used in East Asia.
- Pot bellows were used in ancient Egypt.
- Tatara foot bellows from Japan.
- Accordion bellows, with the characteristic pleated sides, have been used in Europe for many centuries.
- Piston bellows developed in Southeast Asia (probably by the Austronesian peoples) using the principles of the similarly indigenous fire piston. It led to the independent development of bronze and iron metallurgy in Southeast Asia. They were present in various Southeast Asian cultures, and the technology was transported to Madagascar via the Austronesian expansion.

- The technology was later adopted and refined by the Han Chinese into the double-action piston bellows, replacing the native Chinese ox hide pot or drum bellows completely.
- Piston bellows were independently developed in the middle of the 18th century in Europe.

- Metal bellows were made to absorb axial movement in a dynamic condition. Often referred to as Axial Dynamics bellows types.

Chinese bellows were originally made of ox hide with two pots as described in Mozi's book on military technology in the Warring States period (4th century BC). By the Han dynasty, contact with Southeast Asian cultures exposed the Chinese to the bamboo-based piston bellows of Southeast Asians. The acquired piston bellows technology completely replaced the Chinese ox hide bellows that by the Song dynasty, the ox hide bellows were completely extinct. The Han dynasty Chinese mechanical engineer Du Shi (d. 38) is credited with being the first to use hydraulic power on a double-action piston pumps, through a waterwheel, to operate bellows in metallurgy. His invention was used to operate piston bellows of blast furnaces in order to forge cast iron. The ancient Greeks, ancient Romans, and other civilizations used bellows in bloomery furnaces producing wrought iron. Bellows are also used to send pressurized air in a controlled manner in a fired heater.

In modern industry, reciprocating bellows are usually replaced with motorized blowers.

=== Double-acting piston bellows ===
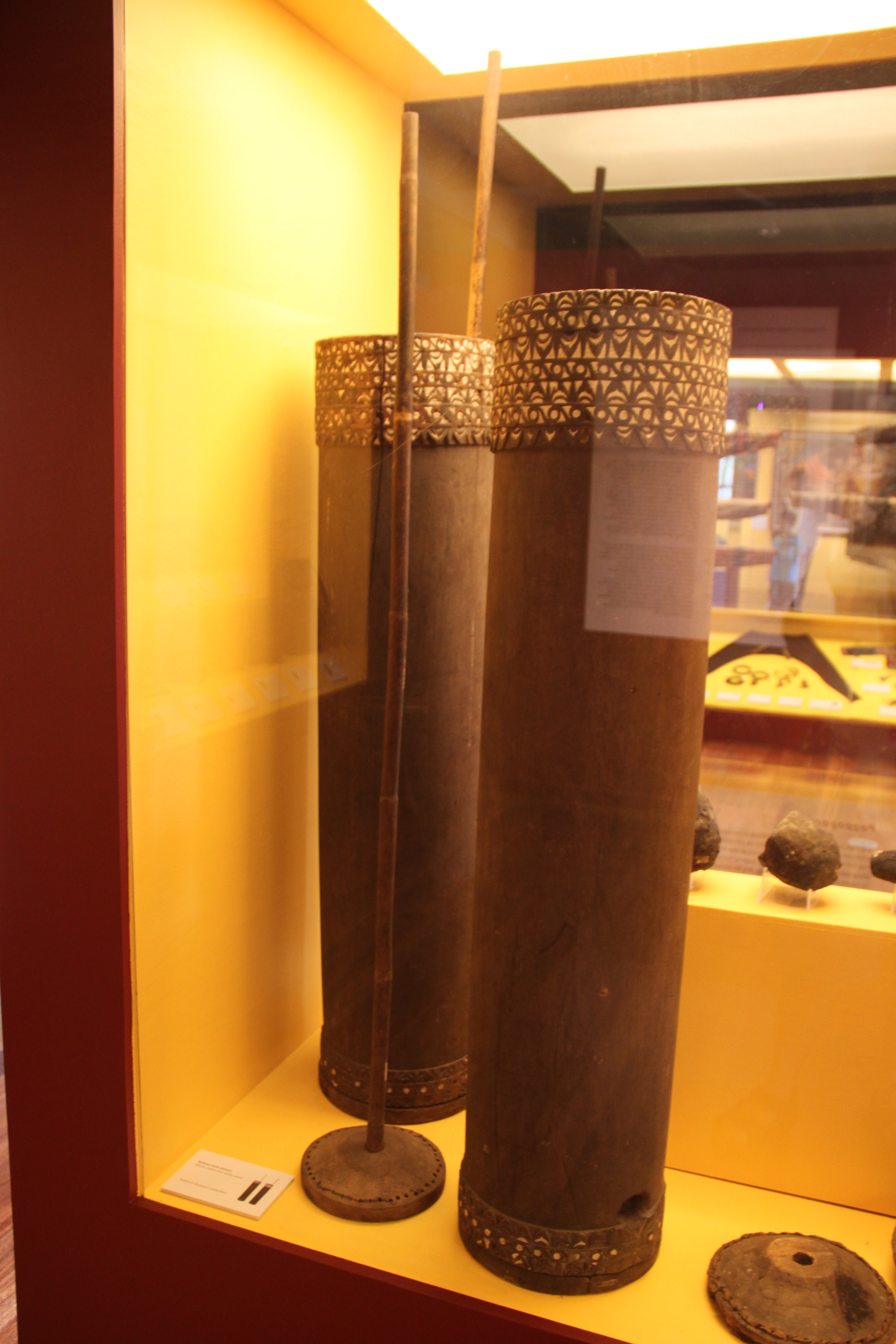
Pair of piston bellow tubes and plungers used by the Moro on display at the Museum of the Filipino People in Manila's Rizal Park.

Double-acting piston bellows are a type of bellows used by blacksmiths and smelters to increase the air flow going into the forge, with the property that air is blown out on both strokes of the handle (in contrast to simpler and more common bellows that blow air when the stroke is in one direction and refill the bellows in the other direction). These bellows blow a more constant, and thus stronger, blast than simple bellows. Such bellows existed in China at least since the 5th century BC, when it was invented, and had reached Europe by the 16th century. In 240 BC, The ancient Greek inventor Ctesibius of Alexandria independently invented a double-action piston bellow used to lift water from one level to another.

A piston is enclosed in a rectangular box with a handle coming out one side. The piston edges are covered with feathers, fur, or soft paper to ensure that it is airtight and lubricated. As the piston is pulled, air enters from the far side and the air in the near chamber is compressed and forced into a side chamber, where it flows through the nozzle. Then as it is pushed air enters from the near side and the air in the far chamber flows through the same nozzle.

=== Double-lung accordion bellows ===
These have three leaves. The middle leaf is fixed in place. The bottom leaf is moved up and down. The top leaf can move freely and has a weight on it. The bottom and the middle leaves contain valves, the top one does not. Only the top lung is connected to the spout.

When the bottom leaf is moved up, air is pumped from the bottom lung into the top lung. At the same time air is leaving the bellows from the top lung through the spout, but at a slower rate. This inflates the top lung. Next the bottom leaf is moved down to pull fresh air into the bellows. While this happens the weight on the top leaf pushes it down, so air keeps leaving through the spout.

This design does not increase the amount of air flow going into the forge, but provides a more constant air flow compared to a simple bellows. It also provides more even air flow than two simple bellows pumped alternately or one double-acting piston bellows.

== Primitive bellows ==
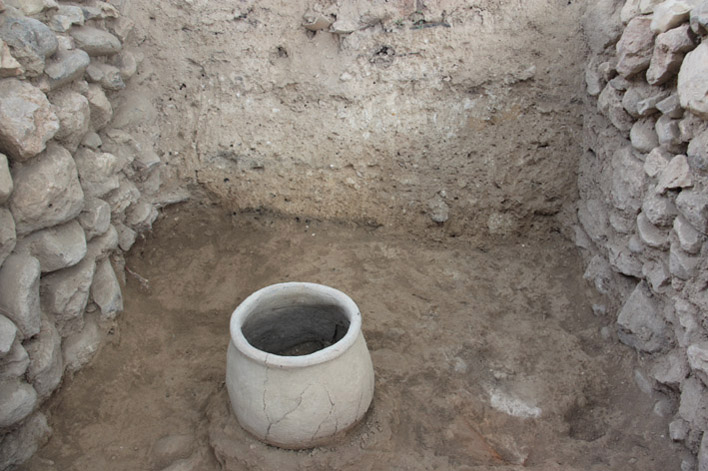
Pot bellows (excavation)

In archaeological ruins of the Levant, archaeologists have found primitive pot bellows, consisting of a ceramic pot to which a loose leather hide had been attached at the top. Such pot bellows were constructed with a wide rim, so that the hide covering would transmit a maximum amount of air when pumped. The covering was fastened to the pot with a cord under an out-turned rim, or in a groove just below the rim exterior. An opening near the base served to insert a pipe of perishable material whose purpose was to direct the air blast to either the furnace or crucible, and which was usually done through the mediation of a tuyère. Tuyères used in conjunction with pot bellows had the function of protecting the ends of perishable tubes leading from the pot into the fire. Places in Saharan Africa still make use of primitive pot bellows.

== Further applications ==
=== Fluid transfer applications ===
- Bellows are used extensively in hydraulic power circuits and cooling loops.
- They are an essential part of anesthesia machines.
- Cuckoo clocks use bellows to blow air through their gedackt (pipes) and imitate the call of the Common Cuckoo bird.
- Musical instruments may employ bellows as a substitute or regulator for air pressure provided by the human lungs:
  - Accordion, concertina and related instruments
  - Reed organ
  - Pipe organ
  - Musette de cour, Uilleann Pipes and some other varieties of bagpipes
  - Harmonium and melodeon
  - Portative

=== Expansion joint applications ===
The term "bellows" is used by extension for a number of applications that do not involve air transfer.

- Bellows are widely used in industrial and mechanical applications such as rod boots, machinery way covers, lift covers and rail covers to protect rods, bearings and seals from dirt.
- Bellows are widely used on articulated buses and trams, to cover the joint where the vehicle bends.
- Bellows are used in mechanical aneroids by acting as a precision indicator of pressure levels based on their lateral movement.
- Bellows tubing, a type of lightweight, flexible, extensible tubing may be used for delivery of gas or air at near-ambient pressure, as in early aqua-lung designs.
- Folding and view cameras use bellows to exclude light while allowing the lens to be moved relative to the film plane for focusing and, mainly in view cameras, to allow the lens to slide and tilt to control the image (camera movements).
- Piping expansion joint: In this application, bellows are formed in series to absorb thermal movement and vibration in piping systems that transport high temperature media such as exhaust gases or steam.

=== Beekeeping ===
Bee smokers have bellows attached to the side to provide air to a slow burning fuel. This allows for an increased rate of combustion and a temporarily higher output of smoke on command, something desirable when calming domesticated bees.

=== Inflatables ===
Bellows are also designed as air foot pumps to blow up inflatables. They come in either high or low volume. High volume foot pumps (4-7 litres per stroke) are used for large inflatables, such as airbeds, inflatable sofas, paddling pools or large inflatable toys; with large amounts of air flowed into the large inflatable per step, the pumping time is reduced. However, the highest litre per stroke can require more effort despite less time. Low volume pumps (3 litres or less) are used for smaller inflatables, such as bike tyres, footballs, small inflatable toys, or pool mattresses - these are not to be used on large inflatables as compressing can be repetitive and time consuming.

== Gallery ==
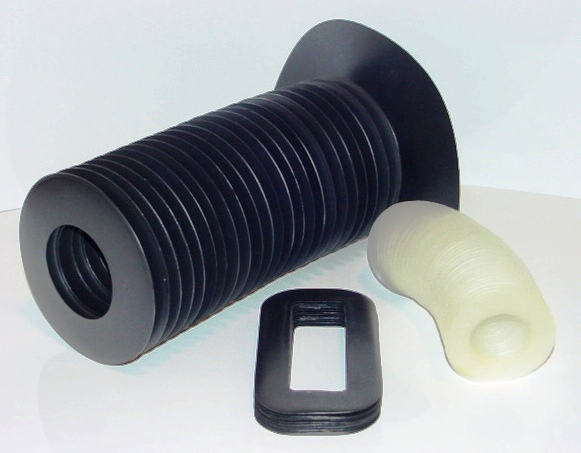
Urethane bellows

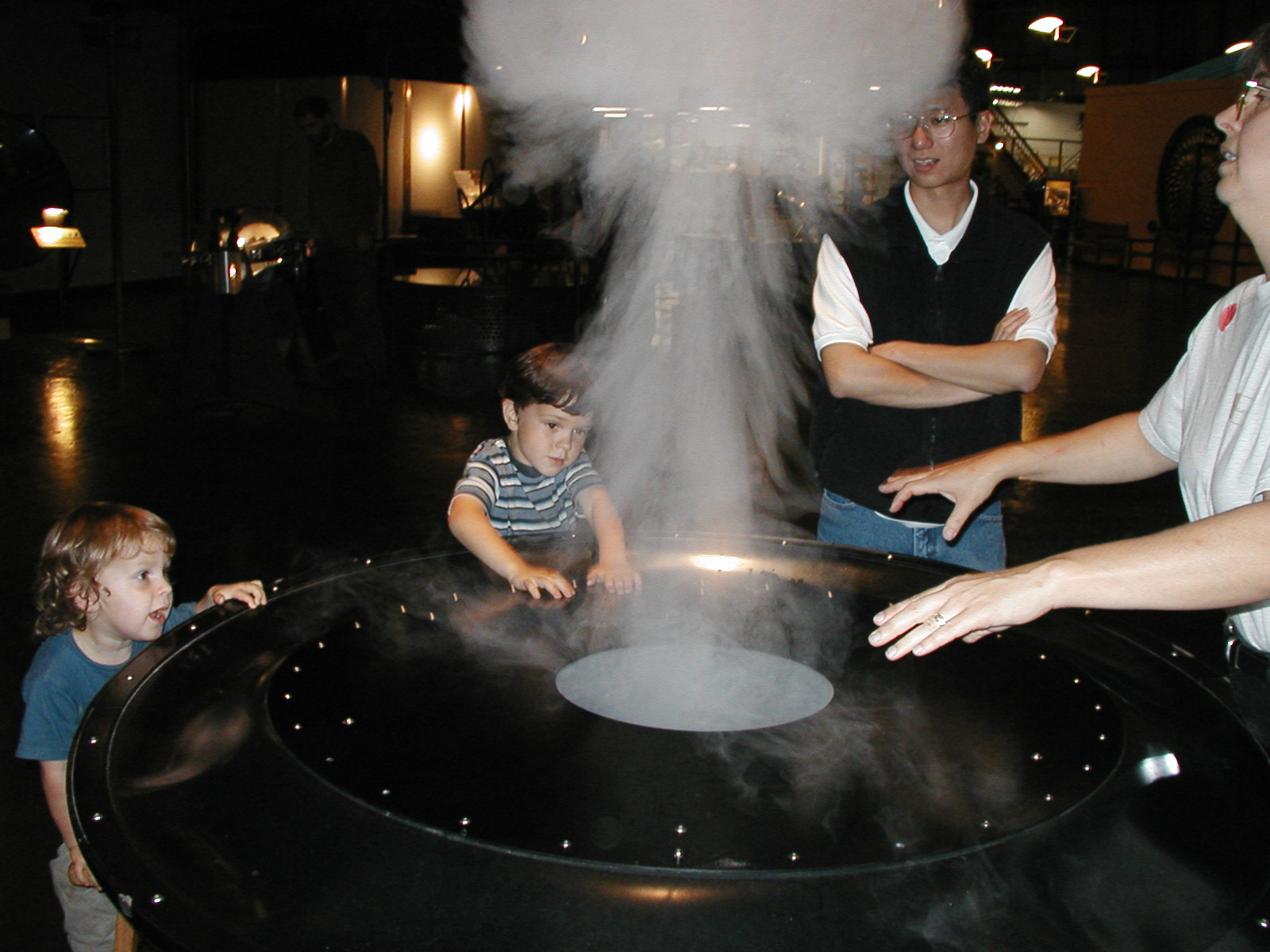
A large bellows creates a mushroom cloud at the Exploratorium in San Francisco, California.

== See also ==
- Sylphon for uses of metal bellows in experimental physics and engineering.
