= Fort Sanders, Knoxville =

- Fort Sanders Historic District
- U.S. National Register of Historic Places
- U.S. Historic district
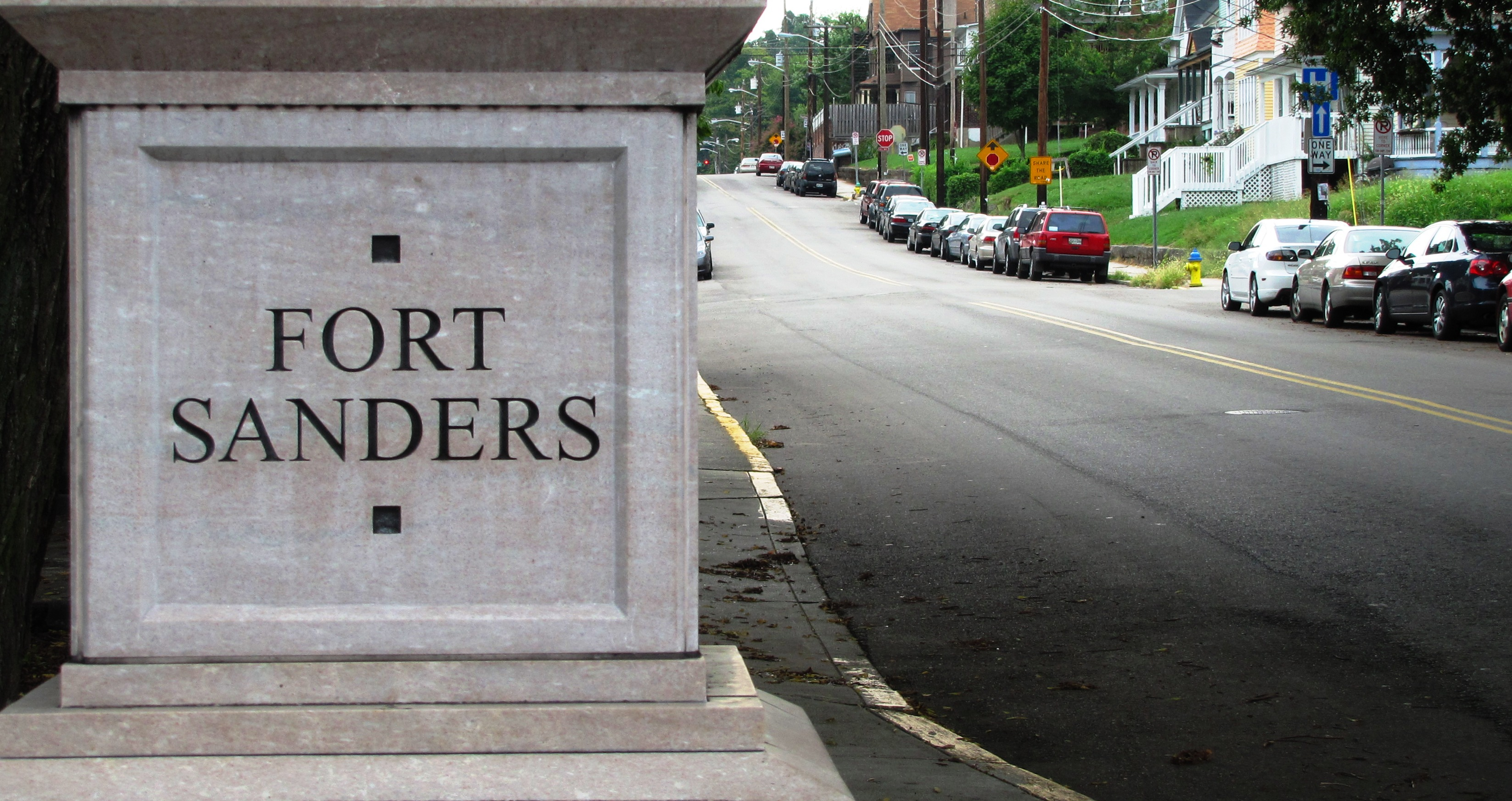

- Location within Tennessee Location within the United States
- Location: Roughly bounded by White and Grand Aves. and 11th and 19th Sts. Knoxville, Tennessee
- Coordinates: 35°57′37″N 83°55′54″W
- Area: approximately 105 acres (42 ha)
- Built: 1880–1930
- Architect: multiple
- Architectural style: Queen Anne, Bungalow/Craftsman, Georgian Revival, Italianate
- NRHP reference No.: 80003839
- Added to NRHP: September 16, 1980

Fort Sanders is a neighborhood in Knoxville, Tennessee, USA, located west of the downtown area and immediately north of the main campus of the University of Tennessee. Developed in the late 19th century as a residential area for Knoxville's growing upper and middle classes, the neighborhood now provides housing primarily for the university's student population. The neighborhood still contains a notable number of its original Victorian-era houses and other buildings, several hundred of which were added to the National Register of Historic Places in 1980 as the Fort Sanders Historic District.

Fort Sanders is named for a Civil War-era Union bastion that once stood near the center of the neighborhood, which was the site of a key engagement in 1863. Before the Union occupation of Knoxville began, Fort Sanders was often referred to as “Fort Loudon” by the occupying Confederate troops. In the 1880s, several of Knoxville's wealthier residents built sizeable houses in what is now the southern half of Fort Sanders, then known as "White's Addition," while the northern half, known as "Ramsey's Addition," was developed to provide housing for plant managers and workers employed in factories along Second Creek. Fort Sanders was incorporated as the separate city of West Knoxville in 1888, and was annexed by Knoxville in 1897. In its early years, Fort Sanders residents included some of Knoxville's leading industrialists and politicians, as well as professors from the University of Tennessee.

Fort Sanders was the childhood home of author James Agee, and provided the setting for his Pulitzer Prize-winning novel, A Death in the Family. A ten-fold expansion of U.T.'s student body after World War II brought about the need for student housing, and many of the old homes in Fort Sanders have since been converted into apartments.

== Location ==
Fort Sanders and the University of Tennessee campus straddle a hill that is bounded by Second Creek on the east, Third Creek on the west, the Tennessee River on the south, and a declivity now traversed by the Southern Railway tracks and Interstate 40 on the north. The university occupies the southern half of the hill, overlooking the river, while Fort Sanders occupies the northern half. Cumberland Avenue (part of U.S. Route 70), commonly called "The Strip," is the approximate boundary between the two. Fort Sanders Regional Medical Center occupies the western half of the Fort Sanders neighborhood.

The World's Fair Park, the site of the 1982 World's Fair, lies opposite Second Creek to the east. The Mechanicsville neighborhood lies on the other side of I-40 to the north. West of the L&N tracks, Cumberland Avenue becomes Kingston Pike, which continues into West Knoxville.

== History ==
=== Battle of Fort Sanders ===
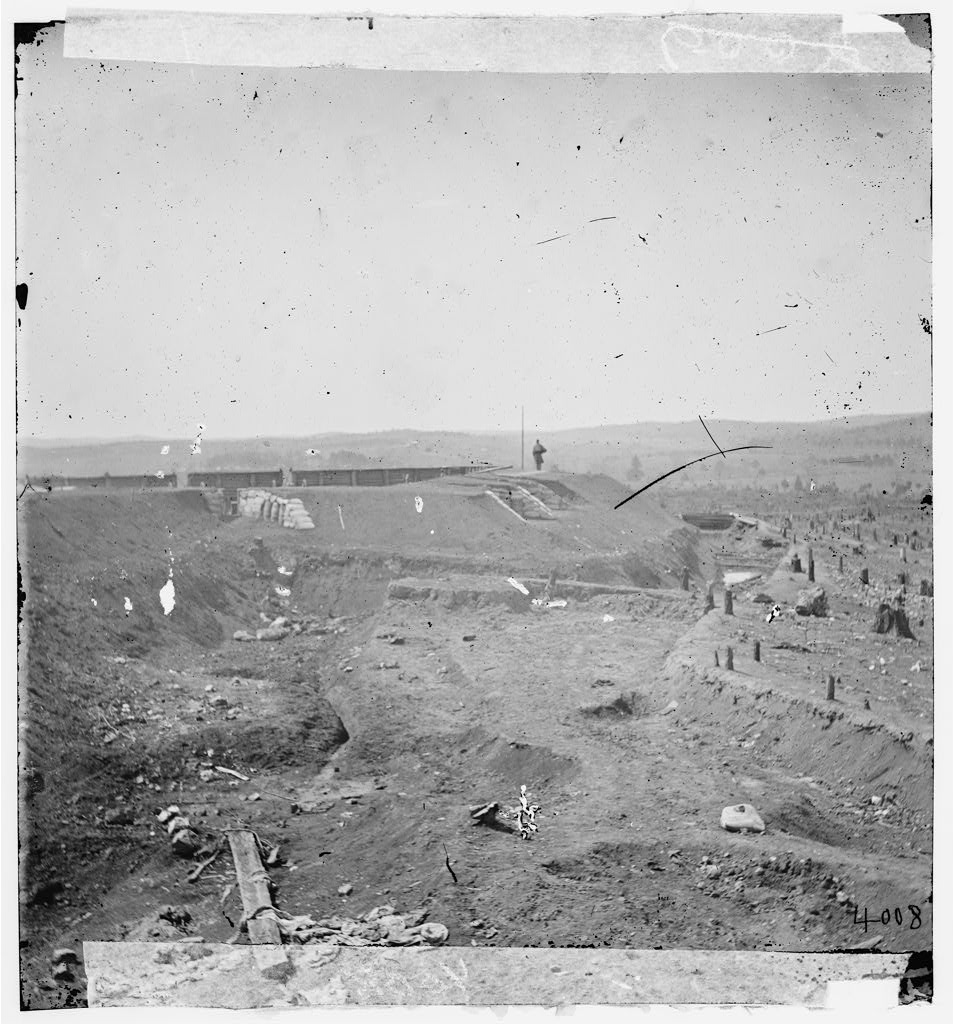
Fort Sanders, photographed in 1864

In November 1863, Confederate forces under General James Longstreet marched north from Chattanooga to Knoxville in hopes of dislodging Union forces under Ambrose Burnside, who had occupied Knoxville a few months prior. After a brief skirmish at Campbell's Station (Farragut), Longstreet's forces approached Knoxville from the west along Kingston Pike. Delaying maneuvers executed by General William P. Sanders gave Union forces in the city time to complete fortifications, although Sanders was mortally wounded on November 18, and died at the Lamar House the following day. With Union fortifications in place, Longstreet decided to surround the city and starve Union forces out.

During the Siege of Knoxville, Confederate pickets stretched roughly along what is now Twenty-First Street between Cumberland and Forest avenues. Union fortifications included Fort Byington atop "The Hill," Battery Noble at what is now the intersection of Melrose and Seventeenth, and Battery Zoellner near the intersection of Highland and Eleventh. Fort Sanders, originally "Fort Loudon" but renamed in honor of the deceased General Sanders by occupying Union forces, was an earthen fort that spanned Seventeenth between Laurel and Clinch, and continued along Laurel and Clinch eastward to Sixteenth Street.

On the morning of November 29, 1863, after a two-week siege, Longstreet ordered three brigades under General Lafayette McLaws to attack Fort Sanders, in hopes of breaching Union lines. The attackers marched from what is now the intersection of Nineteenth and Forest, southeastward across the intersection of Eighteenth and Highland, toward the fort's northeast corner at the intersection of Seventeenth and Laurel. They were unable to overcome a deep trench at the base of the fort, however, and retreated with heavy casualties. The battle, which lasted just twenty minutes, effectively ended Longstreet's chances of taking the city, and he retreated shortly afterward.

=== Early development ===
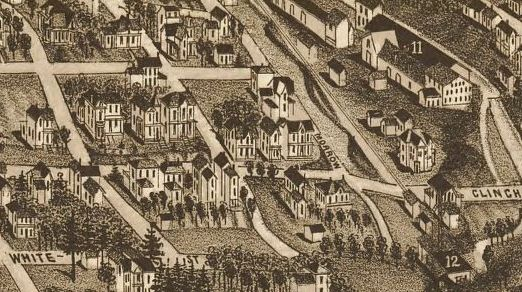
White's Addition, as it appeared on an 1886 map of Knoxville

Knoxville's industrial growth after the Civil War led to a rapid increase in the city's population. During the 1880s, pollution from an ore smelting operation drove residents in the upscale Summit Hill area to seek new homes elsewhere. Several chose the hillslope west of Second Creek known as White's Addition (after Hugh Lawson White, who once owned a house in the area), which stretched from the Tennessee River to what is now Laurel Avenue. Among the earliest to build mansions in White's Addition were candy manufacturer Martin Luther Ross and Tennessee attorney general George Pickle.

During the same period, a number of factories sprang up along Second Creek, and the area known as Ramsey's Addition, which stretched northward from what is now Laurel Avenue to the railroad tracks, developed primarily as housing for factory managers and workers. Unlike the more exclusive White's Addition, residents in Ramsey's Addition ranged from wage workers to upper-level managers, and the neighborhood had a mix of houses ranging from impressive Victorian mansions to small, inconspicuous shotgun-style houses.

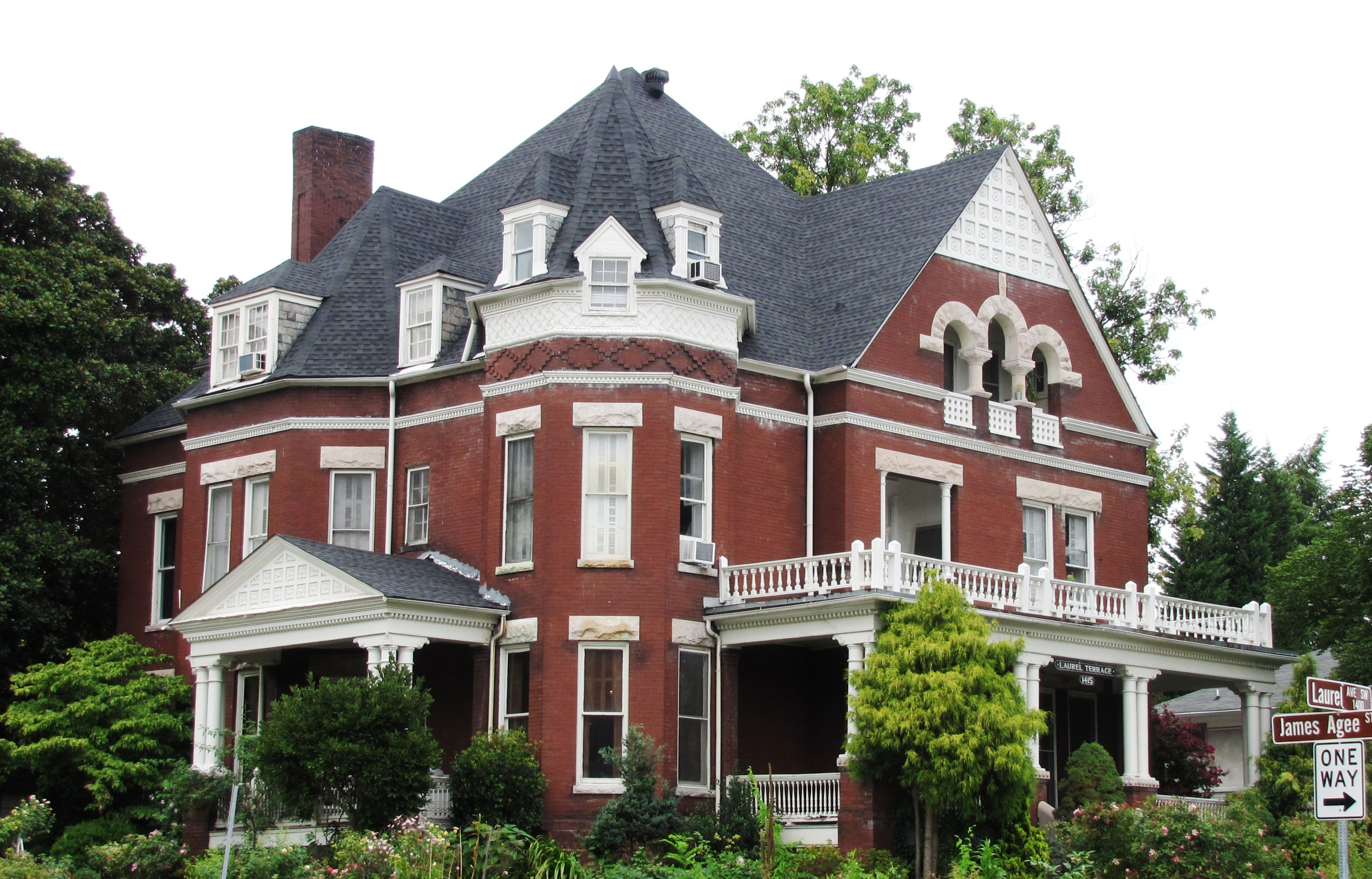
House on Laurel Avenue, built by candy manufacturer Martin Luther Ross in 1894

An 1886 map of Knoxville shows development in the Fort Sanders area stretching as far west as what is now Seventeenth Street. The University of Tennessee consisted of several buildings clustered around "The Hill." Factories located along Second Creek included the Knoxville Tannery, the Caswell Furniture Company, the Knoxville Ice Company, the Barker Bucket Factory, the Knoxville Button Factory, and the massive foundry of the Knoxville Iron Company (part of which still stands). The Samuels Keg Factory and the Knoxville Woolen Mills were located along the railroad tracks at the north end of Ramsey's Addition.

With a need for city services, and bureaucratic issues preventing annexation by Knoxville, the Fort Sanders area incorporated as the separate city of West Knoxville on March 8, 1888. The city's boundaries were Second Creek on the east, Asylum (now Western) Avenue and the railroad tracks on the north, Third Creek on the west, and the river on the south. West Knoxville had an initial population of 1,520, and J.W. Yoe served as the first mayor. West Knoxville was annexed by Knoxville in 1897. Today, "West Knoxville" generally refers to the section of Knoxville along Kingston Pike, west of Third Creek and Alcoa Highway.

=== Later development ===
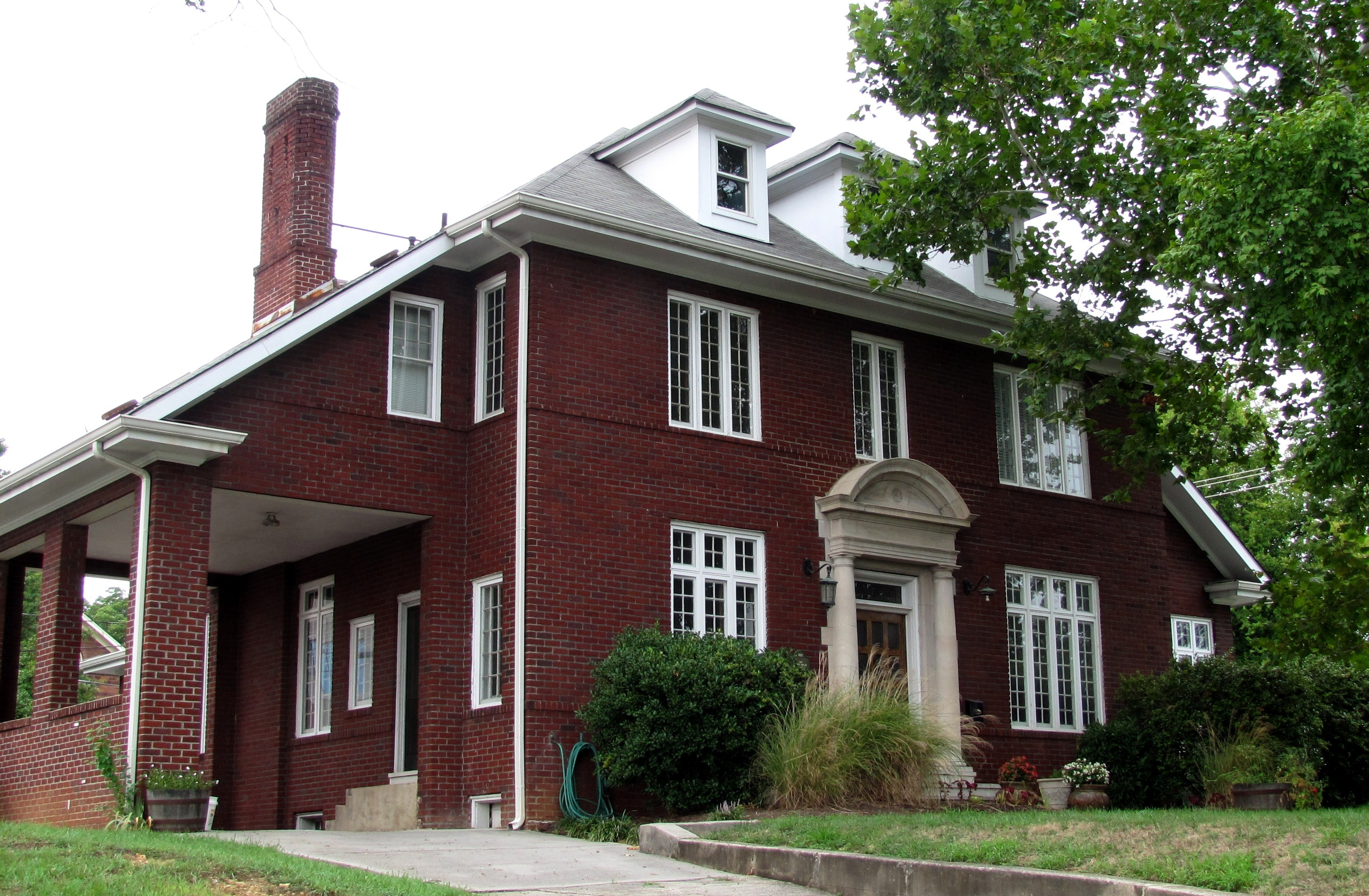
The Roddy House on Clinch Avenue, built circa 1912

During the late nineteenth and early twentieth centuries, Fort Sanders was home to some of Knoxville's key industrial figures. Department store owner Max Arnstein, who built the seven-story Arnstein Building at the south end of Market Square, owned houses at 1403 and 1625 Laurel. Wholesaling tycoon Matthew McClung, a partner in Cowan, McClung and Company, built the house at 1625 Clinch. Marble quarry magnate John J. Craig lived at 1415 Highland, and Coca-Cola bottler J. Patrick Roddy lived at 1803 Clinch. Knoxville Journal founder and editor William Rule lived at 1604 Clinch. Ranson Whittle, the founder of the Whittle Trunk and Bag Company, lived at 1802 Highland.

Fort Sanders was also home to a number early University of Tennessee professors and administrators. Weston Fulton, inventor of the sylphon (used in the manufacture of thermostats), lived at 1202 Clinch in the early 1900s. William Waller Carson, founder of the school's civil engineering department, lived at 1310 Clinch, and later built what is now the Ronald McDonald House at 1705 Clinch. Thomas Jordan, the school's dean in the early 1900s, lived at 1312 White, and mathematics professor Cooper D. Schmitt lived at 1302 White. Schmitt's son, Pulitzer Prize-winning historian Bernadotte Everly Schmitt, lived in the house as a child. Artist Catherine Wiley lived at 1317 White in the 1910s while working as an instructor at UT.

With the advent of the automobile in the 1920s, Knoxville's wealthier residents began to move to suburbs on the periphery of the city, and urban neighborhoods such as Fort Sanders began to decline. After World War II, the University of Tennessee's student body grew from just over 2,000 to almost 30,000 by 1975, and most of the homes in Fort Sanders were converted into student housing. The university's expansion (and more recently the expansion of Fort Sanders Regional Medical Center) led to the destruction of many of the neighborhood's early houses, and preservationists, namely the Fort Sanders Community Improvement Association, increased efforts to protect its historical resources.

=== A Death in the Family ===
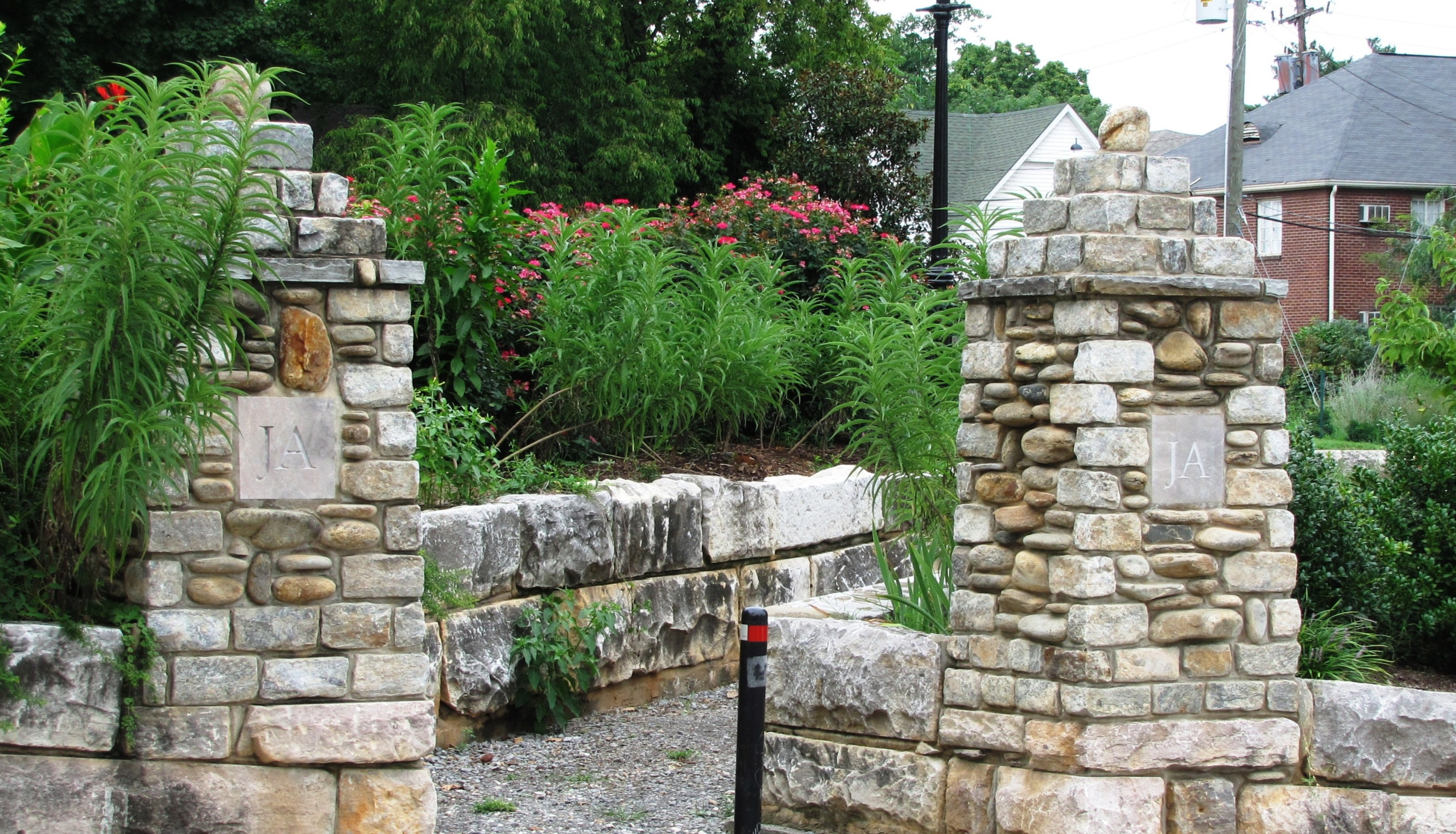
James Agee Park on Laurel

Author James Agee (1909–1955) spent his early childhood in the Fort Sanders neighborhood. The Agees initially lived at 1505 Highland Avenue (the house is no longer standing), but moved to Laurel Avenue after the death of Agee's father in 1915. Agee's maternal grandparents, Joel and Emma Tyler, lived on Clinch Avenue. Joel Tyler was a cofounder of the mill machinery company Ty-Sa-Man, where Agee's father worked.

The Fort Sanders neighborhood provides the primary setting for Agee's Pulitzer Prize-winning novel, A Death in the Family. The novel opens with Agee and his father taking a walk through downtown Knoxville, making stops on Gay Street and Market Square, and passing the Deaf and Dumb Asylum and the L&N Station as they made their way back to Fort Sanders. Agee mentioned a vacant lot along Forest Avenue where he and his father liked to look out on the lights of North Knoxville in the distance, and listen to the engines of the L&N, which "coughed and browsed" in the valley below. The book ends with Agee and his uncle conversing while standing over the "waste of briers and of embanked clay" of the ruins of the Civil War-era Fort Sanders.

In 1999, Fifteenth Street was renamed "James Agee Street." In 2005, James Agee Park was established in a vacant lot (formerly the home of Mayor Samuel B. Luttrell) at the intersection of James Agee Street and Laurel Avenue.

== Fort Sanders today ==
Fort Sanders, or "The Fort" as it is known by residents, remains a popular place for students. Most residents are in their twenties and many go home during the summer, leaving the neighborhood virtually empty compared to its very active, and sometimes belligerent, feel during the school year. Due to the area's younger population and proximity to a large university, the neighborhood is a hotbed for house parties and bars alike. The neighborhood is somewhat infamous in Knoxville for its party atmosphere, and residents have been known to throw multi-street block parties that can attract thousands. The largest of these took place on October 15, 2022, which was the night the Vols broke a 15-year losing streak to Alabama, beating the Crimson Tide 52–49. The block of 13th and Laurel Ave was filled to the brim with people as they lit couches on fire listening to Dixieland Delight. Cumberland Avenue, or "The Strip", is a popular hangout for students, as it contains numerous bars, restaurants, and stores.

During the Fall football season, Fort Sanders, along with the campus itself, serves as a headquarters for Tennessee Volunteers fans' tailgating and pre-game activities.

The Knoxville Police Department and The University of Tennessee's Police Department jointly patrol Fort Sanders. The university operates a fully armed and operational police that helps protect students both on campus and in Fort Sanders.

== Fort Sanders Historic District ==
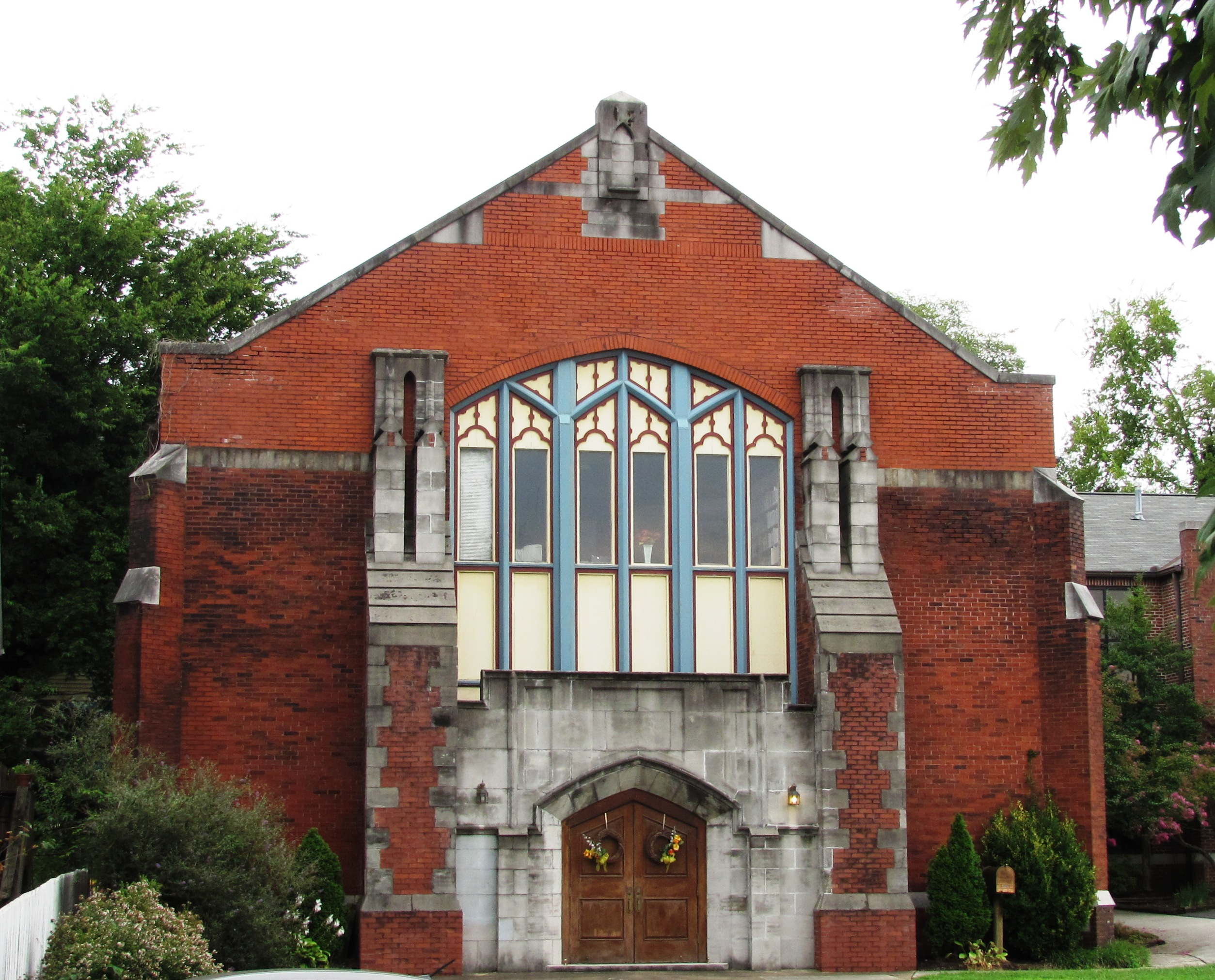
Christ Chapel, formerly the Epworth Methodist Church

The Fort Sanders Historic District, listed on the National Register in 1980, originally consisted of approximately 400 buildings, and covered a 105-acre (42 ha) area bounded by White, Grand, Eleventh, and Nineteenth. Most of the district's contributing houses were built between 1880 and 1930, and the majority were designed in Victorian (especially Queen Anne) or Bungalow/Craftsman styles. The district also includes three churches and several commercial buildings.

=== Notable structures ===
- Christ Chapel (1538 Highland Avenue), originally the Ramsey Methodist Church, and later the Epworth Methodist Church, now home to a non-denominational congregation. The church was originally constructed in 1895, and renovated in 1929 after it was partially destroyed by fire. Christ Chapel purchased and rehabilitated the church in the early 1980s, and built the modern rear addition in 1989.
- Laurel Theater (1538 Laurel Avenue), originally the Fort Sanders Presbyterian Church; a two-story brick church built in 1898.
- 310 Thirteenth Street (Firedog Pizza/Deli), a late nineteenth century Victorian commercial building.
- 307 18th Street (18th Street IGA), a commercial vernacular store built circa 1923; initially known as the W.T. Roberts Grocery Store.
- 1202 Clinch Avenue, a two-story house built in 1876, making it one of the oldest houses in Fort Sanders; once used as a residence by inventor Weston Miller Fulton.

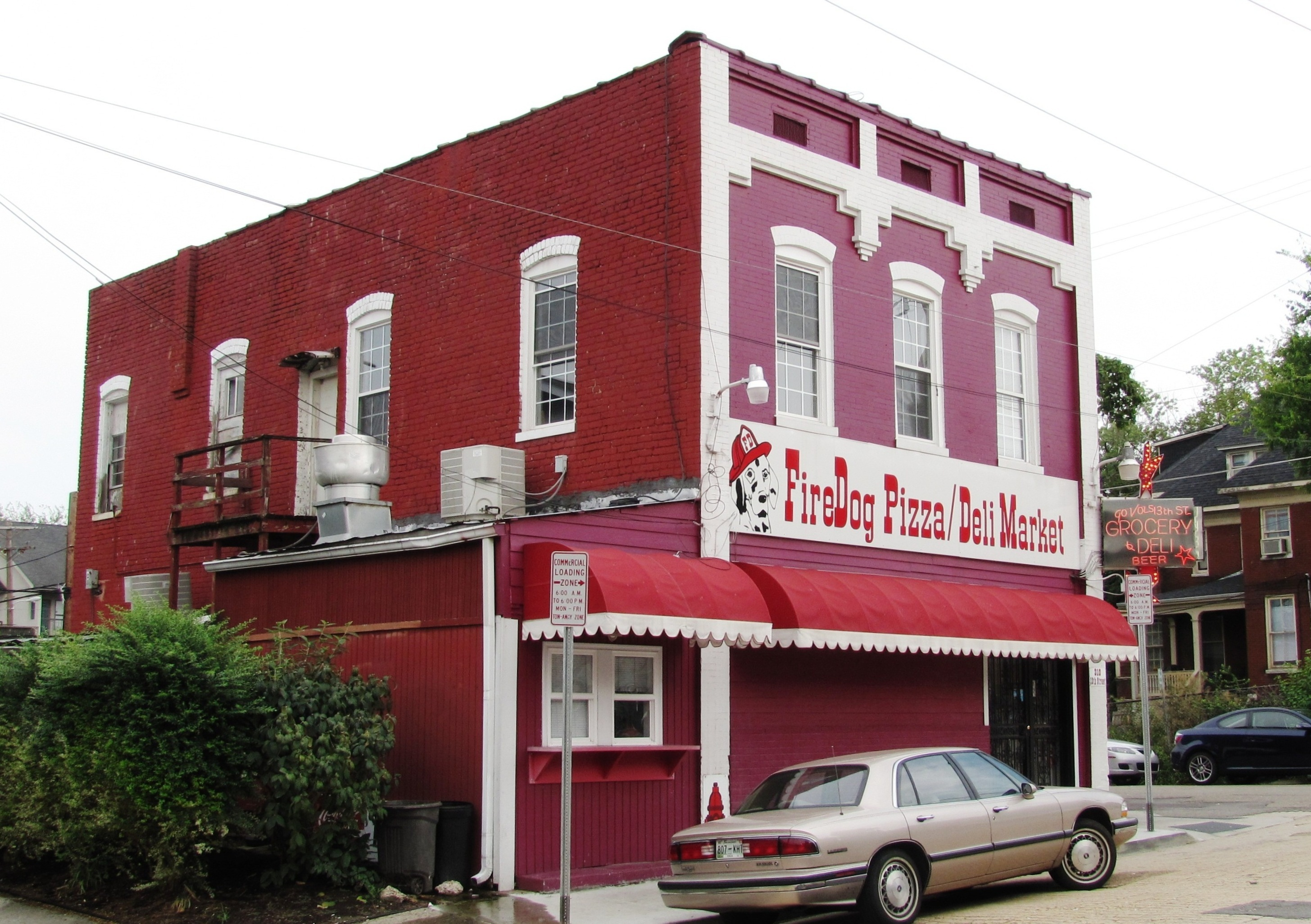
Firedog Pizza/Deli Market on Thirteenth Street

- Laurel Terrace (1415 Laurel Avenue), a 2 1/2-story Queen Anne-style brick house built in 1894 by candy manufacturer Martin Luther Ross.
- 1604 Clinch Avenue, a two-story Georgian Revival house, built in 1914, and used as a residence by publisher and mayor, Captain William Rule; now used by the Church of Jesus Christ of Latter-day Saints.
- Pickle Mansion (1633 Clinch), a Queen Anne-style house built in 1889, with a large wrap-around porch. The house suffered significant damage from a fire in 2002.
- 1705 Clinch Avenue, a 2 1/2-story brick apartment building constructed by University of Tennessee civil engineering professor William Waller Carson in 1903; the Ronald McDonald House purchased the building in 1985.
- 1803 Clinch Avenue, a two-and-a-half-story Georgian Revival-style house built in 1912; this house served as a residence for J. Patrick Roddy, founder of the Roddy Coca-Cola Bottling Company.
- 1308 White Avenue, a Queen Anne-style house built in 1894 for marble company executive James E. Ross. It was subsequently the home of Knoxville judge Charles Hayes Brown. The University of Tennessee has announced plans to purchase and demolish this house, along two adjacent houses, to make way for a new science facility.
