= Metal bellows =

Elastic vessels

Metal bellows are elastic vessels that can be compressed when pressure is applied to the outside of the vessel, or extended under vacuum. When the pressure or vacuum is released, the bellows will return to its original shape, provided the material has not been stressed past its yield strength. They are used both for their ability to deform under pressure and to provide a hermetic seal that allows movement.

Precision bellows technology of the 20th and 21st century is centered on metal bellows with less demanding applications using ones made of rubber and plastic. These products bear little resemblance to the original leather bellows used traditionally in fireplaces and forges.

== Types ==
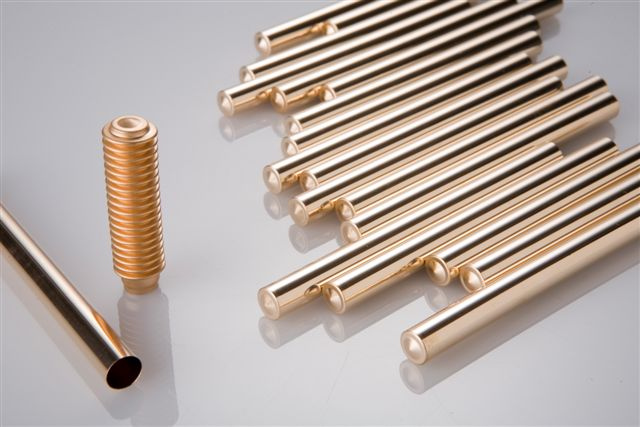
deep drawn tubes for bellows

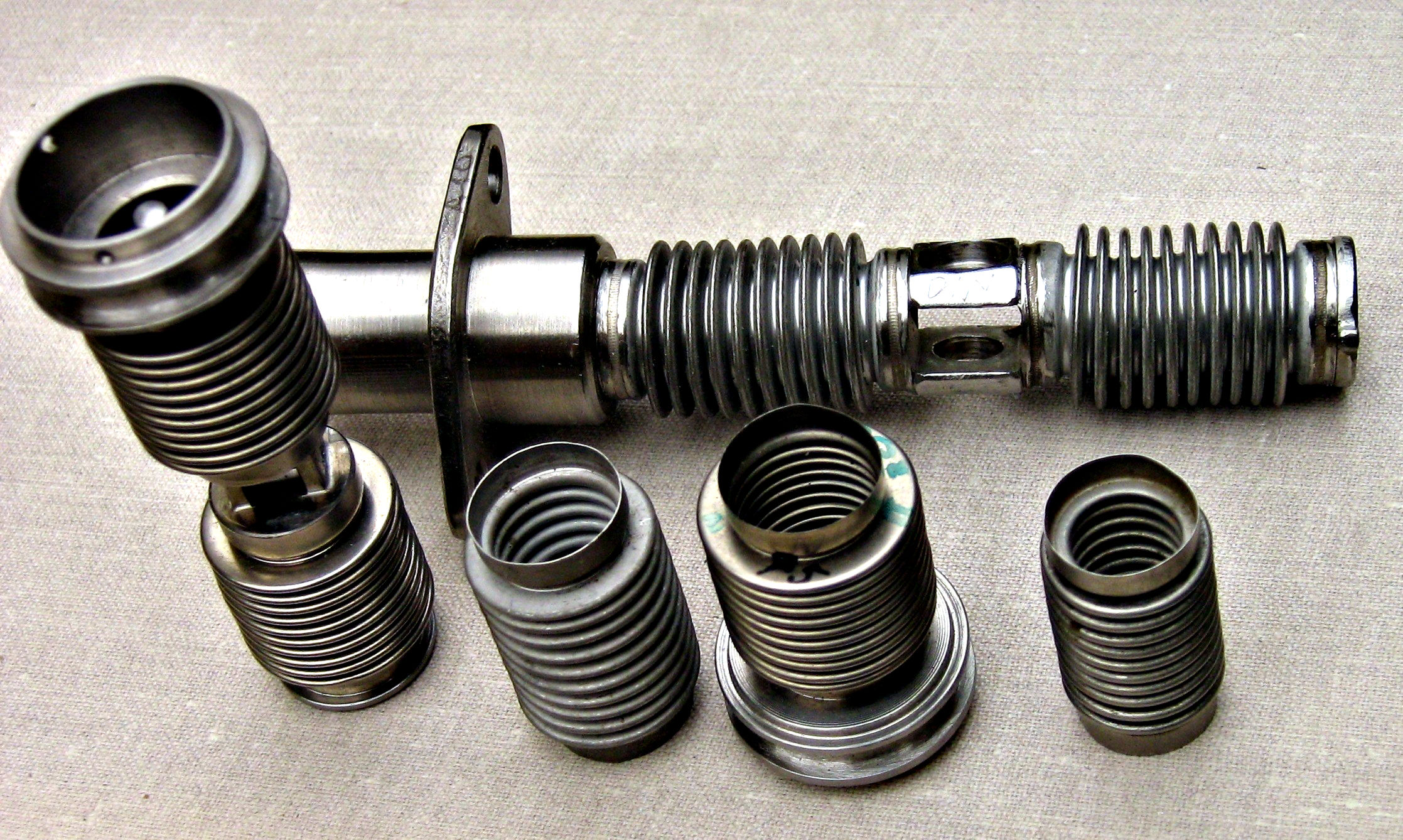
Metal bellows

There are three main types of metal bellows: formed, welded and electroformed.

Formed bellows are produced by reworking tubes, normally produced by deep drawing, with a variety of processes, including cold forming (rolling), and hydroforming. They are also called convoluted bellows or sylphons.

Welded bellows (also called edge-welded, or diaphragm bellows) are manufactured by welding a number of individually formed diaphragms to each other. The comparison between the two bellows types generally centers on cost and performance. Hydroformed bellows generally have a high tooling cost, but, when mass-produced, may have a lower piece price. However, hydroformed bellows have lower performance characteristics due to relatively thick walls and high stiffness. Welded metal bellows are produced with a lower initial tooling cost and maintain higher performance characteristics. The drawback of welded bellows is the reduced metal strength at weld joints, caused by the high temperature of welding.

Electroformed bellows are produced by plating (electroforming) a metal layer onto a model (mandrel), and subsequently removing the mandrel. They can be produced with modest tooling costs and with thin walls (25 micrometres or less), providing such bellows with high sensitivity and precision in many exacting applications, and may also be produced in shapes that would be exceptionally difficult to produce by other means with little additional difficulty.

Another area of comparison is in metals of construction. Hydroformed and rolled bellows are limited to metals with high plastic elongation characteristics, whereas welded bellows may be fabricated from a wider variety of standard and exotic alloys, such as stainless steel and titanium, as well as other high-strength, corrosion-resistant materials. Electroformed bellows can be produced of nickel, its high-strength alloys, and copper.

== Applications ==
Metal bellows are used in a large number of industrial applications. Below you will find a few;

- Load cells; A load cell deforms if a certain load in the form of a pressure or a strain is imposed on it. This deformation is then detected by a strain gauge through which a low voltage direct current is flowing. The change in voltage is detected and made visible on a control panel. A bellows is mounted over the gauge to protect it from outside influences.
- Vacuum interrupters; For the switching of very high voltages in transformer stations a high vacuum, or high pressure dielectric gas must be maintained around the contacts while in service to mitigate arc formation which would damage the contacts and may prevent safe circuit breaking. Here the bellows allow the contacts to move in and out while maintaining a reliable gas-tight seal.
- Mechanical seals; These are mostly used to close the inside of a pump from the outside world to prevent leakage. For that purpose, a mechanical seal is mounted on the pump shaft. As the pump shaft is turning, there has to be a sealing element consisting of a stationary and a rotating ring. To enforce sufficient pressure on the two rings one is fitted with a spring, the bellows allows the free movement of the spring without leakage. The bellows may be constructed such that it also functions as the spring.
- Pressure gauges: If the pressure of aggressive fluids or gases has to be measured, the gauge has to be isolated from the flow. For critical applications, a diaphragm sealing is used instead of a bourdon tube in the gauge. This gives more security that aggressive media will not leak. The diaphragm is a self-contained sensor, transmitting the displacement to the measuring device.
- Sensors: In this application diaphragm or convoluted bellows are completely sealed and filled with a certain gas. Two electrical poles are penetrating the inside of the bellows. By varying the current of those two poles the temperature inside the bellows can be regulated. The expansion or contraction of the bellows is used as an actuator to control a certain movement.
- Valve sealing: A bellows is used between the housing and the valve stem to seal the inside completely from the outside world. In Europe, this is of particular importance as regulations such as TA Luft prohibit any leakage.
- Couplings for stepper motors and servomotors: The flexible part, capable of compensating for misalignment is made by a bellows. It ensures that there is no angular positioning difference between the two coupling halves. This is essential if the positioning accuracy should be extremely precise.
- Exhaust bellows: Running engines cause self vibration. To compensate for those movements and temperature differences resulting in thermal expansion, bellows are used to connect the exhaust gas pipes to the funnel.
- Piping expansion joint: In this application, a short section of bellows is connected between pipes to absorb thermal movement and vibration, typical in high-vacuum, high-temperature, cryogenic, or high purity systems, and factory-sealed systems that must not allow any gas leakage to or from the interior for a lengthy service life.
- Metal bellows are also used in other products and market segments, including medical applications like implantable drug pumps, to industrial actuators, to aerospace applications such as altitude sensors and fluid management devices (accumulators, surge arresters, volume compensators, and fluid storage). Metal bellows are also found in space applications, providing reservoirs with potable water as well as accumulators to collect wastewater.

== Manufacture ==
Welded bellows can be fabricated from a variety of exotic metals and alloys, whereas formed bellows are limited to alloys with good elongation – brass being a prime example. Welded bellows are not fabricated from brass because of its fundamentally poor weldability. Other advantages to welded bellows include compactness (higher performance in a smaller package), ability to be compressed to solid height with no damage, resistance to nicks and dents, and dramatically greater flexibility.

The welding of metal bellows is a microscopic welding process, typically performed under laboratory conditions at high magnification.

Hydroformed bellows are produced by forcing a metal tube to expand under hydraulic pressure inside a bellows-shaped mold, and assume the convoluted shape of the mold.

Electroformed bellows are produced by plating metal onto a bellows-shaped model (mandrel), and the subsequent mandrel removal by chemical or physical means. Due to the low tooling cost and short manufacturing cycle, electroforming of bellows is not only an inexpensive manufacturing method, but also a perfect prototyping tool.

== Deflections ==
There are a variety of expansion joints and not each one can accept the same types of deflection. The various types of deflections are axial, lateral, angular, torsional, cyclic, or any combination that can occur at the same time.
