= Covenant Health (Tennessee) =

American health care provider

- Company type: Nonprofit Organization
- Industry: Health care
- Founded: 1996; 30 years ago
- Headquarters: 244 Fort Sanders W Blvd, Knoxville, Tennessee, United States
- Number of locations: 150 locations (2025)
- Area served: East Tennessee
- Key people: Jim VanderSteeg (CEO); Joe Dolan (CFO)
- Revenue: US$1.683 billion (2023)
- Total assets: US$3.2 billion (2023)
- Number of employees: 11,000+ (2023)
- Website: covenanthealth.com

Covenant Health is an integrated health system organization based in Knoxville, Tennessee, with operations throughout the Knoxville metropolitan area.

Covenant Health was formed in 1996 by the merger of Fort Sanders Health System of Knoxville with the organization that operated Methodist Medical Center of Oak Ridge.

The company reported $1.683 billion in revenue and has a total of $3.2 billion in assets according to their 2023 Annual tax report.

The company employs over 11,000 people, making it one of the largest employers in the region.
