= Sylphon =

Cylindrically symmetrical metal bellows

A sylphon is an old name for a cylindrically symmetrical metal bellows. When made of metal, the sylphon shape was formerly created by metal spinning onto a metal mandrel (model), and now by hydrostatic forming within a mold. Because the mold contains the convolutions of the bellows, the mold must be constructed in parts so that it can be disassembled when the forming process is complete. Experimental physicist John Strong makes occasional use of the term sylphon in his book Procedures in Experimental Physics.

A sylphon, or bellows, is used, among other purposes, to transfer motion through the wall of a vacuum chamber. It can be used as a squeeze piston for simple pumps. It can also be used as a flexible coupling to transfer rotary motion between shafts.

The sylphon was invented in the early 1900s by meteorologist Weston Fulton (1871–1946), who named it for the sylphs of Western mythology. Also, a trade name used by Johnson Controls for pneumatically operated valves and damper actuators utilizing a metal bellows, they were rendered obsolete in the 1930s and 40s.
