= Shell theory =

The term shell theory may refer to:

- The shell theorem of fields and potentials due to a spherically symmetrical body
- Part of the theory of plates and shells in continuum mechanics
- The membrane theory of shells in continuum mechanics
- The nuclear shell model in quantum mechanics
