= Föppl–von Kármán equations =

Set of nonlinear partial differential equations

The Föppl–von Kármán equations, named after August Föppl and Theodore von Kármán, are a set of nonlinear partial differential equations describing the large deflections of thin flat plates. With applications ranging from the design of submarine hulls to the mechanical properties of cell wall, the equations are notoriously difficult to solve, and take the following form:

$$\begin{align}
(1) \qquad & \frac{Eh^3}{12(1-\nu^2)}\nabla^4 w-h\frac{\partial}{\partial x_\beta}\left(\sigma_{\alpha\beta}\frac{\partial w}{\partial x_\alpha}\right)=P \\
(2) \qquad & \frac{\partial\sigma_{\alpha\beta}}{\partial x_\beta}=0
\end{align}$$

where E is the Young's modulus of the plate material (assumed homogeneous and isotropic), υ is the Poisson's ratio, h is the thickness of the plate, w is the out–of–plane deflection of the plate, P is the external normal force per unit area of the plate, σ_{αβ} is the Cauchy stress tensor, and α, β are indices that take values of 1 and 2 (the two orthogonal in-plane directions). The 2-dimensional biharmonic operator is defined as

$$\nabla^4 w := \frac{\partial^2}{\partial x_\alpha \partial x_\alpha}\left[\frac{\partial^2 w}{\partial x_\beta \partial x_\beta}\right]
= \frac{\partial^4 w}{\partial x_1^4} + \frac{\partial^4 w}{\partial x_2^4} + 2\frac{\partial^4 w}{\partial x_1^2 \partial x_2^2} \,.$$

Equation (1) above can be derived from kinematic assumptions and the constitutive relations for the plate. Equations (2) are the two equations for the conservation of linear momentum in two dimensions where it is assumed that the out–of–plane stresses (σ_{33},σ_{13},σ_{23}) are zero.

== Validity ==
While the Föppl–von Kármán equations are of interest from a purely mathematical point of view, the physical validity of these equations is questionable. Ciarlet states: The two-dimensional von Karman equations for plates, originally proposed by von Karman [1910], play a mythical role in applied mathematics. While they have been abundantly, and satisfactorily, studied from the mathematical standpoint, as regards notably various questions of existence, regularity, and bifurcation, of their solutions, their physical soundness has been often seriously questioned. Reasons include the facts that

1. the theory depends on an approximate geometry which is not clearly defined
2. a given variation of stress over a cross-section is assumed arbitrarily
3. a linear constitutive relation is used that does not correspond to a known relation between well defined measures of stress and strain
4. some components of strain are arbitrarily ignored
5. there is a confusion between reference and deformed configurations which makes the theory inapplicable to the large deformations for which it was apparently devised.

Conditions under which these equations are actually applicable and will give reasonable results when solved are discussed in Ciarlet.

== Equations in terms of Airy stress function ==
The three Föppl–von Kármán equations can be reduced to two by introducing the Airy stress function $\varphi$ where

$$\sigma_{11} = \frac{\partial^2 \varphi}{\partial x_2^2} ~,~~
\sigma_{22} = \frac{\partial^2 \varphi}{\partial x_1^2} ~,~~
\sigma_{12} = - \frac{\partial^2 \varphi}{\partial x_1 \partial x_2} \,.$$

Equation (1) becomes

$$\frac{Eh^3}{12(1-\nu^2)}\Delta^2 w-h\left(\frac{\partial^2\varphi}{\partial x_2^2}\frac{\partial^2 w}{\partial x_1^2}+\frac{\partial^2\varphi}{\partial x_1^2}\frac{\partial^2 w}{\partial x_2^2}-2\frac{\partial^2\varphi}{\partial x_1 \, \partial x_2}\frac{\partial^2 w}{\partial x_1 \, \partial x_2}\right)=P$$

while the Airy function satisfies, by construction the force balance equation (2). An equation for $\varphi$ is obtained enforcing the representation of the strain as a function of the stress. One gets

$$\Delta^2\varphi+E\left\{\frac{\partial^2 w}{\partial x_1^2}\frac{\partial^2 w}{\partial x_2^2}-\left(\frac{\partial^2 w}{\partial x_1 \, \partial x_2}\right)^2\right\}=0 \,.$$

== Pure bending ==
For the pure bending of thin plates the equation of equilibrium is $D\Delta^2\ w=P$, where

$$D :=\frac{Eh^3}{12(1-\nu^2)}$$

is called flexural or cylindrical rigidity of the plate.

== Kinematic assumptions (Kirchhoff hypothesis) ==
In the derivation of the Föppl–von Kármán equations the main kinematic assumption (also known as the Kirchhoff hypothesis) is that surface normals to the plane of the plate remain perpendicular to the plate after deformation. It is also assumed that the in-plane (membrane) displacements are small and the change in thickness of the plate is negligible. These assumptions imply that the displacement field u in the plate can be expressed as

$$u_1(x_1,x_2,x_3) = v_1(x_1,x_2)-x_3\,\frac{\partial w}{\partial x_1} ~,~~
u_2(x_1,x_2,x_3) = v_2(x_1,x_2)-x_3\,\frac{\partial w}{\partial x_2} ~,~~
u_3(x_1, x_2, x_3) = w(x_1,x_2)$$

in which v is the in-plane (membrane) displacement. This form of the displacement field implicitly assumes that the amount of rotation of the plate is small.

== Strain-displacement relations (von Kármán strains) ==
The components of the three-dimensional Lagrangian Green strain tensor are defined as

$$E_{ij} := \frac{1}{2}\left[\frac{\partial u_i}{\partial x_j} + \frac{\partial u_j}{\partial x_i}
+ \frac{\partial u_k}{\partial x_i}\,\frac{\partial u_k}{\partial x_j}\right] \,.$$

Substitution of the expressions for the displacement field into the above gives

$$\begin{align}
E_{11} & = \frac{\partial u_1}{\partial x_1}
+ \frac{1}{2}\left[\left(\frac{\partial u_1}{\partial x_1}\right)^2
+ \left(\frac{\partial u_2}{\partial x_1}\right)^2
+ \left(\frac{\partial u_3}{\partial x_1}\right)^2\right]\\
&= \frac{\partial v_1}{\partial x_1} - x_3\,\frac{\partial^2 w}{\partial x_1^2}
+ \frac{1}{2}\left[x_3^2\left(\frac{\partial^2 w}{\partial x_1^2}\right)^2
+ x_3^2\left(\frac{\partial^2 w}{\partial x_1 \partial x_2}\right)^2
+ \left(\frac{\partial w}{\partial x_1}\right)^2\right]\\
E_{22} & = \frac{\partial u_2}{\partial x_2}
+ \frac{1}{2}\left[\left(\frac{\partial u_1}{\partial x_2}\right)^2
+ \left(\frac{\partial u_2}{\partial x_2}\right)^2
+ \left(\frac{\partial u_3}{\partial x_2}\right)^2\right]\\
&= \frac{\partial v_2}{\partial x_2}-x_3\,\frac{\partial^2 w}{\partial x_2^2}
+ \frac{1}{2}\left[x_3^2\left(\frac{\partial^2 w}{\partial x_1 \partial x_2}\right)^2
+ x_3^2\left(\frac{\partial^2 w}{\partial x_2^2}\right)^2
+ \left(\frac{\partial w}{\partial x_2}\right)^2\right]\\
E_{33} & = \frac{\partial u_3}{\partial x_3}
+ \frac{1}{2}\left[\left(\frac{\partial u_1}{\partial x_3}\right)^2
+ \left(\frac{\partial u_2}{\partial x_3}\right)^2
+ \left(\frac{\partial u_3}{\partial x_3}\right)^2\right]\\
&=  \frac{1}{2}\left[\left(\frac{\partial w}{\partial x_1}\right)^2
+ \left(\frac{\partial w}{\partial x_2}\right)^2
\right]\\
E_{12} & = \frac{1}{2}\left[\frac{\partial u_1}{\partial x_2} + \frac{\partial u_2}{\partial x_1}
+ \frac{\partial u_1}{\partial x_1}\,\frac{\partial u_1}{\partial x_2}
+ \frac{\partial u_2}{\partial x_1}\,\frac{\partial u_2}{\partial x_2}
+ \frac{\partial u_3}{\partial x_1}\,\frac{\partial u_3}{\partial x_2}\right]\\
& = \frac{1}{2}\frac{\partial v_1}{\partial x_2} + \frac{1}{2}\frac{\partial v_2}{\partial x_1} -x_3\frac{\partial^2 w}{\partial x_1 \partial x_2}
+ \frac{1}{2}\left[x_3^2\left(\frac{\partial^2 w}{\partial x_1^2}\right)\left(\frac{\partial^2 w}{\partial x_1\partial x_2}\right)
+ x_3^2\left(\frac{\partial^2 w}{\partial x_1 \partial x_2}\right)\left(\frac{\partial^2 w}{\partial x_2^2}\right)
+ \frac{\partial w}{\partial x_1}\,\frac{\partial w}{\partial x_2}\right]\\
E_{23} & = \frac{1}{2}\left[\frac{\partial u_2}{\partial x_3} + \frac{\partial u_3}{\partial x_2}
+ \frac{\partial u_1}{\partial x_2}\,\frac{\partial u_1}{\partial x_3}
+ \frac{\partial u_2}{\partial x_2}\,\frac{\partial u_2}{\partial x_3}
+ \frac{\partial u_3}{\partial x_2}\,\frac{\partial u_3}{\partial x_3}\right]\\
& = \frac{1}{2}\left[x_3\left(\frac{\partial^2 w}{\partial x_1\partial x_2}\right)\left(\frac{\partial w}{\partial x_1}\right)
+ x_3\left(\frac{\partial^2 w}{\partial x_2^2}\right)\left(\frac{\partial w}{\partial x_2}\right)
\right]\\
E_{31} & = \frac{1}{2}\left[\frac{\partial u_3}{\partial x_1} + \frac{\partial u_1}{\partial x_3}
+ \frac{\partial u_1}{\partial x_3}\,\frac{\partial u_1}{\partial x_1}
+ \frac{\partial u_2}{\partial x_3}\,\frac{\partial u_2}{\partial x_1}
+ \frac{\partial u_3}{\partial x_3}\,\frac{\partial u_3}{\partial x_1}\right] \\
& = \frac{1}{2}\left[x_3\left(\frac{\partial w}{\partial x_1}\right)\left(\frac{\partial^2 w}{\partial x_1^2}\right)
+ x_3\left(\frac{\partial w}{\partial x_2}\right)\left(\frac{\partial^2 w}{\partial x_1 \partial x_2}\right)
\right]
\end{align}$$

For small strains but moderate rotations, the higher order terms that cannot be neglected are

$$\left(\frac{\partial w}{\partial x_1}\right)^2 ~,~~  \left(\frac{\partial w}{\partial x_2}\right)^2 ~,~~
\frac{\partial w}{\partial x_1}\,\frac{\partial w}{\partial x_2} \,.$$

Neglecting all other higher order terms, and enforcing the requirement that the plate does not change its thickness, the strain tensor components reduce to the von Kármán strains

$$\begin{align}
E_{11} & = \frac{\partial v_1}{\partial x_1}
+ \frac{1}{2}\left(\frac{\partial w}{\partial x_1}\right)^2
-x_3\,\frac{\partial^2 w}{\partial x_1^2} \\
E_{22} & = \frac{\partial v_2}{\partial x_2}
+ \frac{1}{2}\left(\frac{\partial w}{\partial x_2}\right)^2
-x_3\,\frac{\partial^2 w}{\partial x_2^2} \\
E_{12} & = \frac{1}{2}\left(\frac{\partial v_1}{\partial x_2}+\frac{\partial v_2}{\partial x_1}\right)
+ \frac{1}{2}\,\frac{\partial w}{\partial x_1}\,\frac{\partial w}{\partial x_2}
-x_3\frac{\partial^2 w}{\partial x_1 \partial x_2} \\
E_{33} & =  0 ~,~~ E_{23}  = 0 ~,~~  E_{13} = 0 \,.
\end{align}$$

The first terms are the usual small-strains, for the mid-surface. The second terms, involving squares of displacement gradients, are non-linear, and need to be considered when the plate bending is fairly large (when the rotations are about 10 – 15 degrees). These first two terms together are called the membrane strains. The last terms, involving second derivatives, are the flexural (bending) strains. They involve the curvatures. These zero terms are due to the assumptions of the classical plate theory, which assume elements normal to the mid-plane remain inextensible and line elements perpendicular to the mid-plane remain normal to the mid-plane after deformation.

== Stress–strain relations ==
If we assume that the Cauchy stress tensor components are linearly related to the von Kármán strains by Hooke's law, the plate is isotropic and homogeneous, and that the plate is under a plane stress condition, we have σ_{33} = σ_{13} = σ_{23} = 0 and

$$\begin{bmatrix}\sigma_{11} \\ \sigma_{22} \\ \sigma_{12} \end{bmatrix}
= \cfrac{E}{(1-\nu^2)}
\begin{bmatrix} 1 & \nu &  0 \\
\nu & 1 &  0 \\
0 & 0  & 1-\nu \end{bmatrix}
\begin{bmatrix} E_{11} \\ E_{22} \\ E_{12} \end{bmatrix}$$

Expanding the terms, the three non-zero stresses are

$$\begin{align}
\sigma_{11} &= \cfrac{E}{(1-\nu^2)}\left[\left(\frac{\partial v_1}{\partial x_1}
+ \frac{1}{2}\left(\frac{\partial w}{\partial x_1}\right)^2
-x_3\,\frac{\partial^2 w}{\partial x_1^2} \right) +
\nu\left(\frac{\partial v_2}{\partial x_2}
+ \frac{1}{2}\left(\frac{\partial w}{\partial x_2}\right)^2
-x_3\,\frac{\partial^2 w}{\partial x_2^2}  \right) \right] \\
\sigma_{22} &= \cfrac{E}{(1-\nu^2)}\left[\nu\left(\frac{\partial v_1}{\partial x_1}
+ \frac{1}{2}\left(\frac{\partial w}{\partial x_1}\right)^2
-x_3\,\frac{\partial^2 w}{\partial x_1^2} \right) +
\left(\frac{\partial v_2}{\partial x_2}
+ \frac{1}{2}\left(\frac{\partial w}{\partial x_2}\right)^2
-x_3\,\frac{\partial^2 w}{\partial x_2^2}  \right) \right] \\
\sigma_{12} &= \cfrac{E}{(1+\nu)}\left[\frac{1}{2}\left(\frac{\partial v_1}{\partial x_2}+\frac{\partial v_2}{\partial x_1}\right)
+ \frac{1}{2}\,\frac{\partial w}{\partial x_1}\,\frac{\partial w}{\partial x_2}
-x_3\frac{\partial^2 w}{\partial x_1 \partial x_2} \right] \,.
\end{align}$$

== Stress resultants ==
The stress resultants in the plate are defined as

$$N_{\alpha\beta} := \int_{-h/2}^{h/2} \sigma_{\alpha\beta}\, d x_3 ~,~~
M_{\alpha\beta} := \int_{-h/2}^{h/2} x_3\,\sigma_{\alpha\beta}\, d x_3 \,.$$

Therefore,

$$\begin{align}
N_{11} &= \cfrac{Eh}{2(1-\nu^2)}\left[2\frac{\partial v_1}{\partial x_1} + \left(\frac{\partial w}{\partial x_1}\right)^2
+ 2\nu\frac{\partial v_2}{\partial x_2} + \nu\left(\frac{\partial w}{\partial x_2}\right)^2 \right] \\
N_{22} &= \cfrac{Eh}{2(1-\nu^2)}\left[2\nu\frac{\partial v_1}{\partial x_1} + \nu\left(\frac{\partial w}{\partial x_1}\right)^2
+ 2\frac{\partial v_2}{\partial x_2} + \left(\frac{\partial w}{\partial x_2}\right)^2  \right] \\
N_{12} &= \cfrac{Eh}{2(1+\nu)}\left[\frac{\partial v_1}{\partial x_2} + \frac{\partial v_2}{\partial x_1} + \frac{\partial w}{\partial x_1}\,\frac{\partial w}{\partial x_2} \right]
\end{align}$$

the elimination of the in-plane displacements leads to

$$\begin{align}
\frac{1}{Eh}\left[2(1 + \nu)\frac{\partial^2 N_{12}}{\partial x_1\partial x_2}  - \frac{\partial^2 N_{22}}{\partial x_1 ^2} + \nu\frac{\partial^2 N_{11}}{\partial x_1^2}
- \frac{\partial^2 N_{11}}{\partial x_2^2} + \nu\frac{\partial^2 N_{22}}{\partial x_2^2}\right]
= \left[\frac{\partial^2 w}{\partial x_1^2}\frac{\partial^2 w}{\partial x_2^2} - \left(\frac{\partial^2 w}{\partial x_1\partial x_2}\right)^2\right]
\end{align}$$

and

$$\begin{align}
M_{11} &= -\cfrac{Eh^3}{12(1-\nu^2)}\left[\frac{\partial^2 w}{\partial x_1^2} +\nu \,\frac{\partial^2 w}{\partial x_2^2}  \right] \\
M_{22} &= -\cfrac{Eh^3}{12(1-\nu^2)}\left[\nu \,\frac{\partial^2 w}{\partial x_1^2} +\frac{\partial^2 w}{\partial x_2^2}  \right] \\
M_{12} &= -\cfrac{Eh^3}{12(1+\nu)}\,\frac{\partial^2 w}{\partial x_1 \partial x_2} \,.
\end{align}$$

Solutions are easier to find when the governing equations are expressed in terms of stress resultants rather than the in-plane stresses.

== Equations of equilibrium ==
The weak form of the Kirchhoff plate is

$$\int_{\Omega}\int_{-h/2}^{h/2}\rho \ddot{u}_i\delta u_i \,d\Omega dx_3+ \int_{\Omega}\int_{-h/2}^{h/2} \sigma_{ij}\delta E_{ij}\,d\Omega dx_3 + \int_{\Omega}\int_{-h/2}^{h/2} p_i \delta u_i \,d\Omega dx_3 =0$$

here Ω denotes the mid-plane. The weak form leads to

$$\begin{align}
\int_{\Omega}\rho h \ddot{v}_1 \delta v_1 \,d\Omega
&+ \int_{\Omega} N_{11}\frac{\partial\delta v_1}{\partial x_1} + N_{12}\frac{\partial\delta v_1}{\partial x_2}\,d\Omega  = -\int_{\Omega} p_1 \delta v_1 \,d\Omega \\
\int_{\Omega}\rho h \ddot{v}_2 \delta v_2 \,d\Omega
&+ \int_{\Omega} N_{22}\frac{\partial\delta v_2}{\partial x_2} + N_{12}\frac{\partial\delta v_2}{\partial x_1}\,d\Omega  = -\int_{\Omega} p_2 \delta v_2 \,d\Omega \\
\int_{\Omega}\rho h \ddot{w} \delta w \,d\Omega
&+ \int_{\Omega} N_{11}\frac{\partial w}{\partial x_1}\frac{\partial\delta w}{\partial x_1} - M_{11}\frac{\partial^2 \delta w}{\partial^2 x_1} \,d\Omega\\
&+ \int_{\Omega} N_{22}\frac{\partial w}{\partial x_2}\frac{\partial\delta w}{\partial x_2} - M_{22}\frac{\partial^2 \delta w}{\partial^2 x_2} \,d\Omega\\
&+ \int_{\Omega} N_{12}\left(\frac{\partial \delta w}{\partial x_1}\frac{\partial\delta w}{\partial x_2} + \frac{\partial  w}{\partial x_1}\frac{\partial\delta w}{\partial x_2}\right) - 2M_{12}\frac{\partial^2 \delta w}{\partial x_1\partial x_2} \,d\Omega = -\int_{\Omega} p_3 \delta w \,d\Omega\\
\end{align}$$

The resulting governing equations are

$$\begin{align}
&\rho h \ddot{w} - \frac{\partial^2 M_{11}}{\partial x_1^2} - \frac{\partial^2 M_{22}}{\partial x_2^2} - 2\frac{\partial^2 M_{12}}{\partial x_1\partial x_2} -
\frac{\partial}{\partial x_1}\left(N_{11}\,\frac{\partial w}{\partial x_1} + N_{12}\,\frac{\partial w}{\partial x_2}\right) -
\frac{\partial}{\partial x_2}\left(N_{12}\,\frac{\partial w}{\partial x_1} + N_{22}\,\frac{\partial w}{\partial x_2}\right) = -p_3 \\
& \rho h \ddot{v}_1 - \frac{\partial N_{11}}{\partial x_1}- \frac{\partial N_{12}}{\partial x_2} = -p_1\\
& \rho h \ddot{v}_2 - \frac{\partial N_{21}}{\partial x_1}- \frac{\partial N_{22}}{\partial x_2} = -p_2 \,.
\end{align}$$

== In terms of stress resultants ==
The Föppl–von Kármán equations are typically derived with an energy approach by considering variations of internal energy and the virtual work done by external forces. The resulting static governing equations (equations of equilibrium) are

$$\begin{align}
&\frac{\partial^2 M_{11}}{\partial x_1^2} + \frac{\partial^2 M_{22}}{\partial x_2^2} + 2\frac{\partial^2 M_{12}}{\partial x_1\partial x_2} +
\frac{\partial}{\partial x_1}\left(N_{11}\,\frac{\partial w}{\partial x_1} + N_{12}\,\frac{\partial w}{\partial x_2}\right) +
\frac{\partial}{\partial x_2}\left(N_{12}\,\frac{\partial w}{\partial x_1} + N_{22}\,\frac{\partial w}{\partial x_2}\right) = P \\
& \frac{\partial N_{\alpha\beta}}{\partial x_\beta} = 0 \,.
\end{align}$$

When the deflections are small compared to the overall dimensions of the plate, and the mid-surface strains are neglected,

$$\begin{align}
\frac{\partial w}{\partial x_1} \approx 0 ,\frac{\partial w}{\partial x_2} \approx 0, v_1 \approx 0, v_2\approx 0
\end{align}$$.

The equations of equilibrium are reduced (pure bending of thin plates) to

$$\frac{\partial^2 M_{11}}{\partial x_1^2} + \frac{\partial^2 M_{22}}{\partial x_2^2} + 2\frac{\partial^2 M_{12}}{\partial x_1\partial x_2} = P$$.

== See also ==
- Plate theory
