= Seatter =

Seatter is a surname. Notable people with the surname include:

- Michael Seatter (1945–2008), English rugby player and footballer

== See also ==
- Satter
