= James E. Hubbard Jr. =

Dr. James E. Hubbard Jr
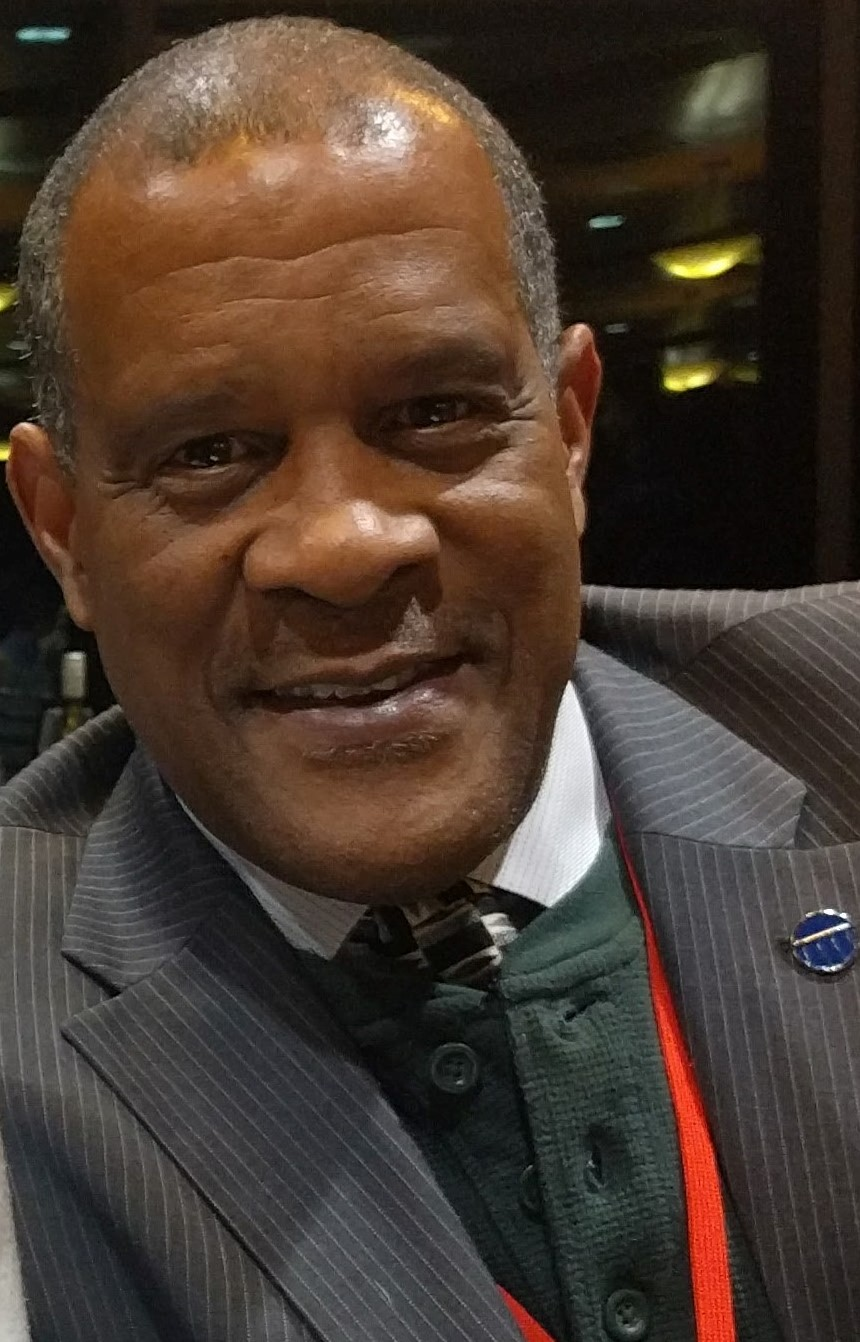
- Born: December 21, 1951 (age 74); Danville, Virginia
- Education: B.S., M.S., and Ph.D. in mechanical engineering from Massachusetts Institute of Technology
- Occupation: Mechanical engineer
- Known for: Founding father of the field of adaptive structures

Dr. James E. Hubbard Jr (born December 21, 1951) is a mechanical engineer who has made significant contributions to the field of aerospace engineering throughout a career spanning more than four decades in academia and industry.

Hubbard is considered a pioneer in the field of adaptive structures having developed piezo-film sensors and piezoelectric actuation systems for suppressing vibration and noise, surface morphing, and other applications. Hubbard has published more than 100 technical papers and three books in the areas of adaptive structures and photonics. He cofounded three companies and has received 24 U.S. and worldwide patents, leading to technological advances benefiting the aerospace, medical, defense, and other industries.

In 2016, Hubbard was elected a member of the National Academy of Engineering for advances in the modelling, design, analyses, and application of adaptive structures. He has also received the International Society for Optics and Photonics' Smart Structures Product Innovation Award (1999) and the Lifetime Achievement Award (2016).

== Career ==
Following graduation from Baltimore Polytechnic Institute (an engineering high school), Hubbard began his career in 1971 as an engineering officer in the U.S. Merchant Marine shipping munition and equipment to the war effort in Vietnam. He was one of only a handful of African Americans serving in the U.S. Merchant Marine fleet, and at 19, he became one of the youngest servicemen licensed by the U.S. Coast Guard as a marine engineer. Hubbard graduated from Massachusetts Institute of Technology (MIT) with his B.S. and M.S. degrees in mechanical engineering in 1977 and 1979, respectively. For his doctorate, Hubbard researched helicopter aeroacoustics, and in 1982, he became MIT's first black Ph.D. in mechanical engineering.

Hubbard served on the faculty at MIT researching active vibration control of structures. Hubbard's research in the early 1980s led to what many consider the first example of an adaptive structure, one that can change its structural characteristics in response to external stimuli. Mechanical vibrations can cause systems – particularly large spacecraft structures such as telescopes and satellites – to fail or affect their precision. In 1985, Hubbard and coauthor Thomas Bailey published a seminal paper describing how a thin, continuous piezoelectric film could both sense vibration and apply its own electric force to dampen the vibrations of a steel beam. Hubbard was granted two patents for this research. Today, he is considered the founding father of the field of adaptive structures, which has numerous applications ranging from damping vibrations to morphing aircraft to deployable space structures. As an assistant professor at MIT, Hubbard received one of five nationwide IBM Young Faculty Development Awards. For his teaching and mentoring efforts, Hubbard earned the Goodwin Medal for "conspicuously effective" teaching and the Steward Award for outstanding service to the community. He was also recognized as a Scott Foundation Fellow and Vertical Flight Foundation Fellow. While lecturing at MIT, Hubbard also held positions at two research and development organizations, Charles Stark Draper Laboratory and Optron Systems, Inc. As chief of adaptive sensors at Charles Stark Draper Laboratory, he was recognized with annual awards for best technical patent, best paper, and best invention.

In 1995, he accepted a position at Boston University's newly founded Photonics Center, a research institution and high-tech incubator. While at the Photonics Center, Hubbard cofounded two companies – PhotoSense, Inc. and iProvica Inc. – and developed 12 patents, including one for Smart Skin technology. Smart Skin is a large-area sensing surface with a wide range of applications from hospital beds that can track a patient's medical indicators to car seats that sense the size and weight of a passenger.

In 2004, Hubbard joined the University of Maryland as director to both the Morpheus Laboratory and the Center of Adaptive Aerospace Vehicle Technology at NASA's National Institute of Aerospace. The research program focused on improving the aerodynamic efficiency of modern air vehicles by enabling radical shape change – for example, improving the fuel efficiency and range of drones by designing wings that morph as aerodynamic conditions change. Hubbard is currently a Texas A&M Engineering Experiment Station Eminent Professor and Hagler Institute for Advanced Studies Fellow at Texas A&M University in College Station, Texas. He is leading the StarLab at the RELLIS Campus where researchers are advancing the science of autonomous vehicles and human–robot teaming. This work becomes increasingly important as autonomous vehicles are used in a growing number of applications, from self-driving cars to crop surveys to search-and-rescue missions.
