= Sater =

Sater may refer to:

== People ==
- Almir Sater, Brazilian singer-songwriter and actor
- David Sater, American politician in Missouri
- Dorothy Hayes Sater, American television reporter in Nebraska
- Felix Sater (born 1966), Russian-American mobster, real estate developer associated with Donald Trump
- Janet Sater, American mechanical engineer
- John Elbert Sater, American federal judge
- Paul Abdel Sater, Lebanese bishop of the Maronite Catholic Patriarchate of Antioch
- Steven Sater, American playwright and screenwriter

== Places ==
- Säter, a small city in central Sweden
- Säter Municipality based on Säter

== See also ==
- Satter, a surname
