= Membrane Theory =

Membrane Theory may refer to:

- M-theory, a theory in physics that unifies all of the consistent versions of superstring theory
- Membrane theory of shells, describes the mechanical properties of shells
- Membrane potential, a theory that explained the resting potential of nerve and muscle as a diffusion potential
