= Plate (structure) =

Structural element

A plate is a structural element which is characterized by a three-dimensional solid whose thickness is very small when compared with other dimensions.

The effects of the loads that are expected to be applied on it only generate stresses whose resultants are, in practical terms, exclusively normal to the element's thickness. Their mechanics are the main subject of the plate theory.

Thin plates are initially flat structural members bounded by two parallel planes, called faces, and a cylindrical surface, called an edge or boundary. The generators of the cylindrical surface are perpendicular to the plane faces. The distance between the plane faces is called the thickness (h) of the plate. It will be assumed that the plate thickness is small compared with other characteristic dimensions of the faces (length, width, diameter, etc.). Geometrically, plates are bounded either by straight or curved boundaries. The static or dynamic loads carried by plates are predominantly perpendicular to the plate faces.

== See also ==
- Bending of plates
- Shell (structure)
