= Janet Sater =

American mechanical engineer

Janet M. Sater is an American mechanical engineer at the Institute for Defense Analyses, where her research has involved advanced composite materials, smart structures, exoskeletons, and biomimetics.

Sater is the daughter of an electrical engineer, and went into college intending to study marine biology. Instead she shifted to engineering, specializing in metallurgy, after discovering an affinity with working with her hands and eyes. She went to Purdue University for graduate study, focusing on work with aluminum. There, she earned a master's degree in 1985, and completed her Ph.D. in 1988.

In 2014, Purdue gave her the title of Outstanding Materials Engineer "in recognition of her demonstrated excellence in the areas of materials processing and manufacturing, composites, smart/adaptive materials and structures, morphing materials and structures, nastic materials, and biomimetic materials and her dedication to the School of Materials Engineering". She was named as an ASME Fellow in 2015, and is also a Fellow of ASM International. In 2022, the American Society of Mechanical Engineers gave her their Dedicated Service Award.
