= Active structure =

Building or transport method that can change its shape at operator's will

An active structure (also known as a smart or adaptive structure) is a mechanical structure with the ability to alter its configuration, form or properties in response to changes in the environment.

The term active structure also refers to structures that, unlike traditional engineering structures (e.g., bridges, buildings), require constant motion and hence power input to remain stable. The advantage of active structures is that they can be far more massive than a traditional static structure: an example would be a space fountain, a building that reaches into space.

== Function ==
The result of the activity is a structure more suited for the type and magnitude of the load it is carrying. For example, an orientation change of a beam could reduce the maximum stress or strain level, while a shape change could render a structure less susceptible to dynamic vibrations. A good example of an adaptive structure is the human body where the skeleton carries a wide range of loads and the muscles change its configuration to do so. Consider carrying a backpack. If the upper body did not adjust the centre of mass of the whole system slightly by leaning forward, the person would fall on their back.

An active structure consists of three integral components besides the load carrying part. They are the sensors, the processor and the actuators. In the case of a human body, the sensory nerves are the sensors which gather information of the environment. The brain acts as the processor to evaluate the information and decide to act accordingly and therefore instructs the muscles, which act as actuators to respond. In heavy engineering, there is already an emerging trend to incorporate activation into bridges and domes to minimize vibrations under wind and earthquake loads.

Aviation engineering and aerospace engineering have been the main driving force in developing modern active structures. Aircraft (and spacecraft) require adaptation because they are exposed to many different environments, and therefore loadings, during their lifetime. Prior to launching they are subjected to gravity or dead loads, during takeoff they are subjected to extreme dynamic and inertial loads and in-flight they need to be in a configuration which minimizes drag but promotes lift. A lot of effort has been committed into adaptive aircraft wings to produce one that can control the separation of boundary layers and turbulence. Many space structures utilize adaptivity to survive extreme environmental challenges in space or to achieve precise accuracies. For example, space antennas and mirrors can be activated to precise orientation. As space technology advances, some sensitive equipment (namely interferometric optical and infrared astronomical instruments) are required to be accurate in position as delicate as a few nanometres, while the supporting active structure is tens of metres in dimensions.

== Design ==
Human-made actuators existing in the market, even the most sophisticated ones, are nearly all one-dimensional. This means they are only capable of extending and contracting along, or rotating about 1 axis. Actuators capable of movement in both forward and reverse directions are known as two-way actuators, as opposed to one-way actuators which can only move in one direction. The limiting capability of actuators has restricted active structures to two main types: active truss structures, based on linear actuators, and manipulator arms, based on rotary actuators.

A good active structure has a number of requirements. First, it needs to be easily actuated. The actuation should be energy-saving. A structure which is very stiff and strongly resists morphing is therefore not desirable. Second, the resulting structure must have structural integrity to carry the design loads. Therefore, the process of actuation should not jeopardize the structure's strength. More precisely, we can say: We seek an active structure where actuation of some members will lead to a geometry change without substantially altering its stress state. In other words, a structure that has both statical determinacy and kinematic determinacy is optimal for actuation.

== Applications ==
Active-control technology is applied in civil engineering, mechanical engineering and aerospace engineering. Although most civil engineering structures are static, active control is utilized in some civil structures for deployment against seismic loading, wind loading and environmental vibration. Also, active control is proposed to be used for damage tolerance purposes where human intervention is restricted. Korkmaz et al. demonstrated configuration of active control system for a damage tolerance and deployment of a bridge.

== See also ==
- James E. Hubbard, Jr.
- Tuned mass damper
