= Satter =

Satter is a surname. Notable people with the surname include:

- Beryl Satter (born 1959), American historian
- David Satter (born 1947), American journalist
- Gustave Satter (1832–1879), Austrian classical composer and pianist
- Jack Satter, American baseball team owner and philanthropist
- Jonathan Satter (born 1969), American businessman
- Muneer Satter (born 1960), American investor and philanthropist
- Rodney J. Satter (1925–2011), American politician
- Ruth Lyttle Satter (1923–1989), American botanist
- Tina Satter, American playwright and theatre director

== See also ==
- Sater (disambiguation)
