= Shell (structure) =

Thin-walled structural element

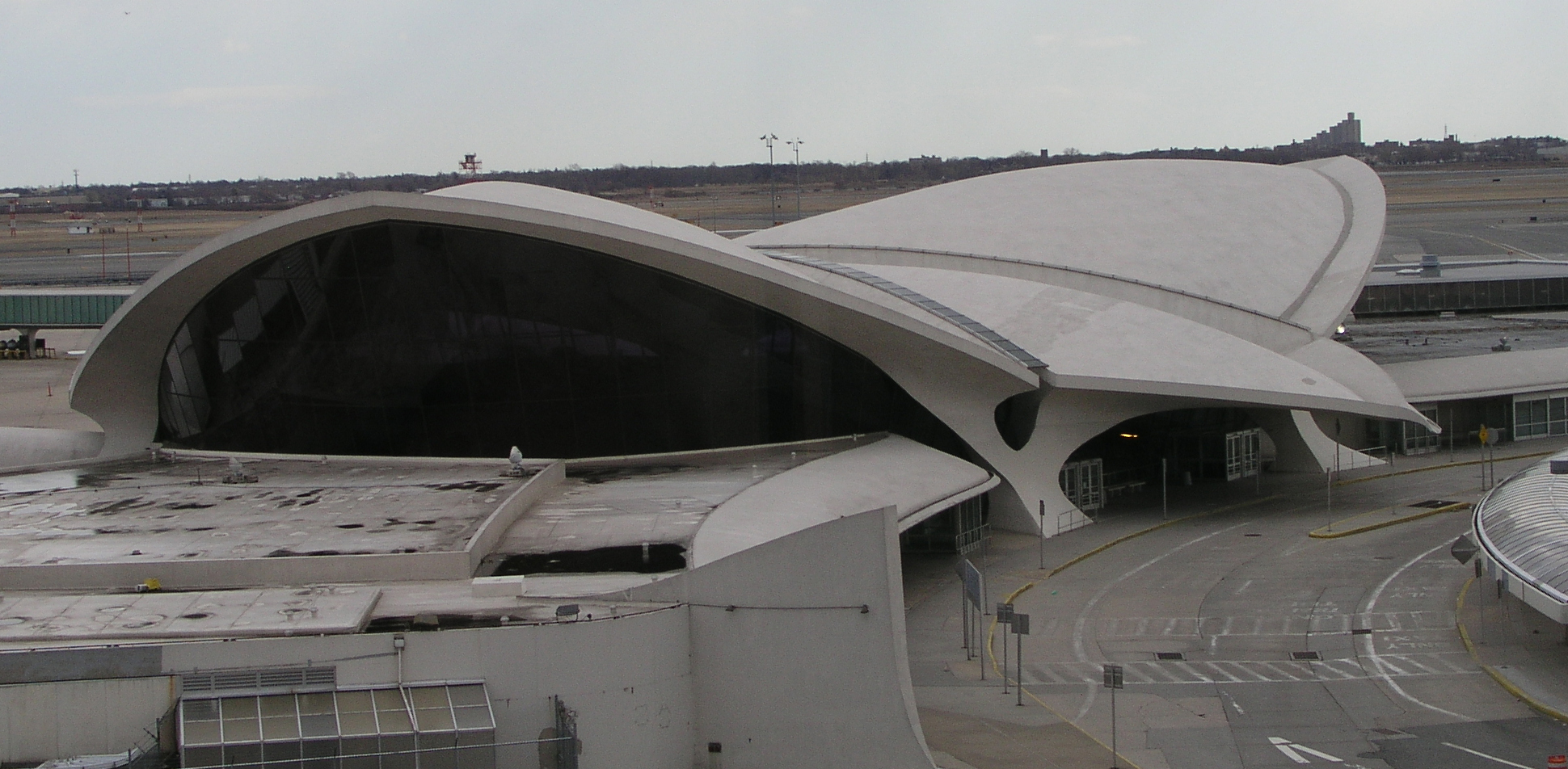
Shell structure of the TWA Flight Center Building by Eero Saarinen, John F. Kennedy International Airport, New York

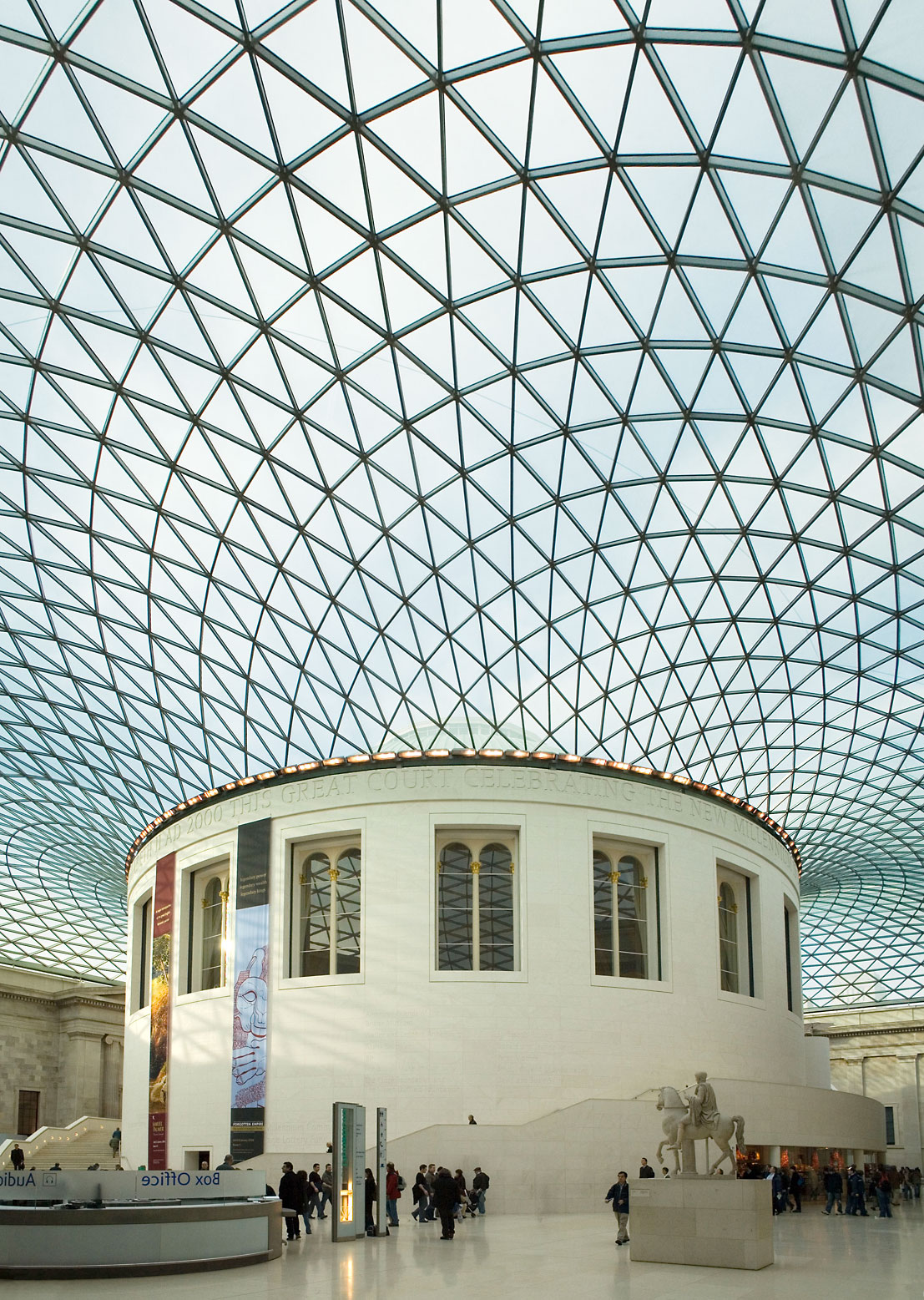
Great Court, with a lattice thin-shell roof by Buro Happold with Norman Foster, British Museum, London

A shell is a three-dimensional solid structural element whose thickness is very small compared to its other dimensions. It is characterized in structural terms by mid-plane stress which is both coplanar and normal to the surface. A shell can be derived from a plate in two steps: by initially forming the middle surface as a singly or doubly curved surface, then by applying loads which are coplanar to the plate's plane thus generating significant stresses. Materials range from concrete (a concrete shell) to fabric (as in fabric structures).

Thin-shell structures (also called plate and shell structures) are lightweight constructions using shell elements. These elements, typically curved, are assembled to make large structures. Typical applications include aircraft fuselages, boat hulls, and the roofs of large buildings.

== Definition ==
A thin shell is defined as a shell with a thickness which is small compared to its other dimensions and in which deformations are not large compared to thickness. A primary difference between a shell structure and a plate structure is that, in the unstressed state, the shell structure has curvature as opposed to the plates structure which is flat. Membrane action in a shell is primarily caused by in-plane forces (plane stress), but there may be secondary forces resulting from flexural deformations. Where a flat plate acts similar to a beam with bending and shear stresses, shells are analogous to a cable which resists loads through tensile stresses. The ideal thin shell must be capable of developing both tension and compression.

== Types ==
The most popular types of thin-shell structures are:

- Concrete shell structures, often cast as a monolithic dome or stressed ribbon bridge or saddle roof
- Lattice shell structures, also called gridshell structures, often in the form of a geodesic dome or a hyperboloid structure
- Membrane structures, which include fabric structures and other tensile structures, cable domes, and pneumatic structures.

== See also ==
- Monocoque
- Diagrid
- Stretched grid method
- List of thin-shell structures

Persons related:

- Félix Candela
- Dyckerhoff & Widmann
- Wilhelm Flügge
- Eugène Freyssinet
- Heinz Isler
- Pier Luigi Nervi
- Plate
- Frei Otto
- Ernest Edwin Sechler
- Vladimir Shukhov
  - All-Russia Exhibition 1896
- Eduardo Torroja
- Membrane theory of shells
