= Smart intelligent aircraft structure =

Aerospace engineering principle

The term "smart structures" is commonly used for structures which have the ability to adapt to environmental conditions according to the design requirements. As a rule, the adjustments are designed and performed in order to increase the efficiency or safety of the structure. Combining "smart structures" with the "sophistication" achieved in materials science, information technology, measurement science, sensors, actuators, signal processing, nanotechnology, cybernetics, artificial intelligence, and biomimetics, one can talk about Smart Intelligent Structures. In other words, structures which are able to sense their environment, self-diagnose their condition and adapt in such a way as to make the design more useful and efficient.

The concept of Smart Intelligent Aircraft Structures offers significant improvements in aircraft total weight, manufacturing cost and, above all, operational cost by an integration of system tasks into the load carrying structure. It also helps to improve the aircraft's life cycle and reduce its maintenance. Individual morphing concepts also have the ability to decrease airframe generated noise and hence reduce the effect of air traffic noise near airports. Furthermore, cruise drag reductions have a positive effect on fuel consumption and required take-off fuel load.

== Morphing structures ==
Fixed geometry wings are optimized for a single design point, identified through altitude, Mach number, weight, etc. Their development is always a compromise between design and off-design points, referred to a typical mission. This is emphasised for civil aircraft where flight profiles are almost standard. Nevertheless, it may occur to fly at high speeds and low altitude with light weight over a short stretch or to fly at low speeds and high altitude with maximum load for a longer range. The lift coefficient would then range between 0.08 and 0.4, with the aircraft experiencing up to 30% weight reduction as the fuel is consumed. These changes could be compensated by wing camber variations, to pursue optimal geometry for any flight condition, thus improving aerodynamic and structural performance.

Existing aircraft cannot change shape without aerodynamic gaps, something that can be solved with Smart Intelligent Structures. By ensuring the detailed consideration of structural needs throughout the entire lifetime of an aircraft and focusing on the structural integration of needed past capabilities, Smart Intelligent Aircraft Structures will allow aircraft designers to seriously consider conformal morphing technologies. The reduced drag during take-off, cruise and landing for future and ecologically improved civil aircraft wings can be achieved through naturally laminar wing technology, by incorporating a gapless and deformable leading edge device with lift providing capability. Such a morphing structure typically consists of a flexible outer skin and an internal driving mechanism (Figure 1). Current aircraft designs already employ winglets aimed at increasing the cruise flight efficiency by induced drag reduction. Smart intelligent Structures propose a state of the art technology that incorporates a wingtip active trailing edge, which could be a means of reducing winglet and wing loads at key flight conditions.

== Structural health monitoring ==
Another component of an "intelligent" aircraft structure is the ability to sense and diagnose potential threats to its structural integrity. This differs from conventional non-destructive testing (NDT) by the fact that Structural Health Monitoring (SHM) uses sensors that are permanently bonded or embedded in the structure. Composite materials, which are highly susceptible to hidden internal flaws which may occur during manufacturing and processing of the material or while the structure is subjected to service loads, require a substantial amount of inspection and defect monitoring at regular intervals. Thus, the increasing use of composite materials for aircraft primary structure aircraft components increases substantially their life cycle cost. According to some estimates, over 25% of the life cycle cost of an aircraft or aerospace structure, which includes pre-production, production, and post-production costs, can be attributed to operation and support, involving inspection and maintenance. With sensing technology reducing in cost, size and weight, and sensor signal processing power continuously increasing, a variety of approaches have been developed allowing integration of such sensing options onto or into structural components.

Although available in principle, none of these SHM technologies have currently achieved a sufficient level of maturity such that SHM could be reliably applied to real engineering structures. A real reduction of life cycle costs related to maintenance and inspections can only be achieved by SHM systems designed as "fail-safe" components and included within a damage tolerance assessment scenario, able to reduce the inspection times (or their intervals) by investigating the structure quickly and reliably and avoiding the time-consuming disassembly of structural parts.

== Multifunctional materials ==
The advantages of carbon fibre reinforced polymers (CFRPs) over metallic materials in terms of specific stiffness and strength are well known. In the last few years, there has been a sharp increase in the demand for composite materials with integrated multifunctional capabilities for use in aeronautical structures.

However, a major drawback with CFRPs for primary structural applications is their low toughness and damage tolerance. Epoxy resins are brittle and have poor impact strength and resistance to crack propagation, resulting in unsatisfactory levels of robustness and reliability. This results in designs with large margins of safety and complex inspection operations. In addition, by increasing the relative fraction of composite components within new aircraft, challenges regarding electrical conductivity have arisen such as lightning strike protection, static discharge, electrical bonding and grounding, interference shielding and current return through the structure. These drawbacks can be solved by the use of emerging technologies such as nanocomposites, which combine mechanical, electrical and thermal properties.

Nanoparticle reinforced resins have been found to offer two distinct advantages over current resin systems. First of all, they are able to provide an increase in fracture toughness of up to 50% for older liquid resin infusion (LRI) resins and 30% in more advanced systems. Secondly, percolated nanoparticles drastically improve resin conductivity, turning it from a perfect isolator into a semiconductor. While improved damage tolerance properties could directly lead to structural weight savings, the exploitation of electrical properties could also enable a simpler, and hence cheaper, Electrical Structure Network (ESN).

== Running research activities to implement the above technologies to aircraft ==
Developing these technologies for future A/C, there is currently (2011 – 2015) a running project, partially funded by the European Commission, called "SARISTU" (Smart Intelligent Aircraft Structures) with a total budget of €51,000,000. This initiative is coordinated by Airbus and brings together 64 partners from 16 European countries. SARISTU focuses on the cost reduction of air travel through a variety of individual applications as well as their combination. Specifically, the integration of different conformal morphing concepts in a laminar wing is intended to improve aircraft performance through a 6% drag reduction, with a positive effect on fuel consumption and required take-off fuel load. A side effect will be a decrease of up to 6 dB(A) of the airframe generated noise, thus reducing the impact of air traffic noise in the vicinity of airports. Recent calculations and Computational Fluid Dynamics Analysis indicate that the target is likely to be exceeded but will still need to be offset against a possible weight penalty.

Another expected outcome is to limit the integration cost of Structural Health Monitoring (SHM) systems by moving the system integration as far forward in the manufacturing chain as possible. In this manner, SHM integration becomes a feasible concept to enable in-service inspection cost reductions of up to 1%. Structural Health Monitoring related trials indicate that specific aircraft inspections may gain higher benefits than originally anticipated.

Finally, the incorporation of Carbon Nanotubes into aeronautical resins is expected to enable weight savings of up to 3% when compared to the unmodified skin/stringer/frame system, while a combination of technologies is expected to decrease Electrical Structure Network installation costs by up to 15%.
