= Pure bending =

Solid mechanics model of a weightless beam under a bending moment

In solid mechanics, pure bending (also known as the theory of simple bending) is a condition of stress where a bending moment is applied to a beam without the simultaneous presence of axial, shear, or torsional forces. Pure bending occurs only under a constant bending moment (M) since the shear force (V), which is equal to $\tfrac{dM}{dx},$ has to be equal to zero. In reality, a state of pure bending does not practically exist, because such a state needs an absolutely weightless member. The state of pure bending is an approximation made to derive formulas.

== Kinematics of pure bending ==
1. In pure bending the axial lines bend to form circumferential lines and transverse lines remain straight and become radial lines.
2. Axial lines that do not extend or contract form a neutral surface.

== Assumptions made in the theory of Pure Bending ==
1. The material of the beam is homogeneous^{1} and isotropic^{2}.
2. The material is linearly elastic and obeys Hooke’s Law within the range of stresses produced by bending.
3. The transverse sections which were plane before bending, remain plane after bending also.
4. The beam is initially straight and all longitudinal filaments bend into circular arcs with a common centre of curvature.
5. The radius of curvature is large as compared to the dimensions of the cross-section.
6. Each layer of the beam is free to expand or contract, independently of the layer, above or below it.

Notes: ^{1} Homogeneous means the material is of same kind throughout. ^{2} Isotropic means that the elastic properties in all directions are equal.
