= Membrane theory of shells =

Describes the mechanical properties of shells

The membrane theory of shells, or membrane theory for short, describes the mechanical properties of shells when twisting or under bending and assumes that bending moments are small enough to be negligible.

The spectacular simplification of membrane theory makes possible the examination of a wide variety of shapes and supports, in particular, tanks and shell roofs. There are heavy penalties paid for this simplification, and such inadequacies are apparent through critical inspection, remaining within the theory, of solutions. However, this theory is more than a first approximation. If a shell is shaped and supported so as to carry the load within a membrane stress system it may be a desirable solution to the design problem, i.e., thin, light and stiff.

== See also ==
- Theory of plates and shells
- Stress resultants in plates and shells
