= Structural element =

Irreducible parts of a load-bearing structural system

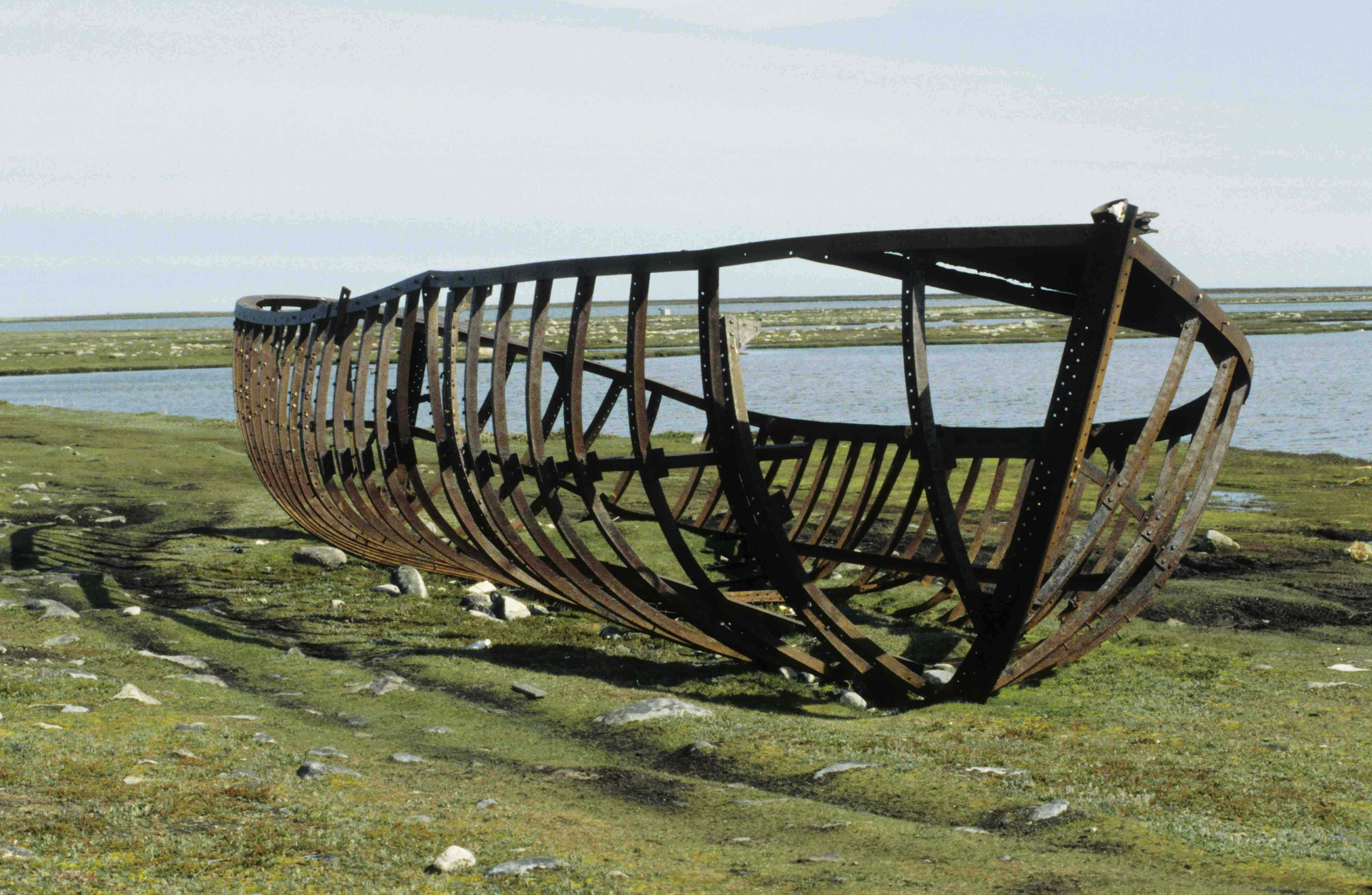
Iron frame of supply ship Qulaittuq set on the beach near Arviat, Nunavut, Canada

In structural engineering, structural elements are used in structural analysis to split a complex structure into simple elements (each bearing a structural load). Within a structure, an element cannot be broken down (decomposed) into parts of different kinds (e.g., beam or column).

Structural building components are specialized structural building products designed, engineered and manufactured under controlled conditions for a specific application. They are incorporated into the overall building structural system by a building designer. Examples are wood or steel roof trusses, floor trusses, floor panels, I-joists, or engineered beams and headers. A structural building component manufacturer or truss manufacturer is an individual or company regularly engaged in the manufacturing of components.

Structural elements can be lines, surfaces or volumes.

Line elements:

- Rod - axial loads
- Beam - axial and bending loads
- Pillar
- Post (structural)
- Struts or Compression members- compressive loads
- Ties, Tie rods, eyebars, guy-wires, suspension cables, or wire ropes - tension loads

Surface elements:

- membrane - in-plane loads only
- shell - in plane and bending moments
  - Concrete slab
  - deck
- shear panel - shear loads only

Volumes:

- Axial, shear and bending loads for all three dimensions

== See also ==
- Load-bearing wall
- Post and lintel
- Stressed member engine
