= Sedleian Professor of Natural Philosophy =

Named professorship at the University of Oxford

The Sedleian Professor of Natural Philosophy is the name of a chair at the Mathematical Institute of the University of Oxford.

== Overview ==
The Sedleian Chair was founded by Sir William Sedley who, by his will dated 20 October 1618, left the sum of £2,000 to the University of Oxford for purchase of lands for its endowment. Sedley's bequest took effect in 1621 with the purchase of an estate at Waddesdon in Buckinghamshire to produce the necessary income.

It is regarded as the oldest of Oxford's scientific chairs. Holders of the Sedleian Professorship have, since the mid 19th century, worked in a range of areas of applied mathematics and mathematical physics. They are simultaneously elected to fellowships at Queen's College, Oxford.

The Sedleian Professors in the past century have been Augustus Love (1899-1940), who was distinguished for his work in the mathematical theory of elasticity, Sydney Chapman (1946-1953), who is renowned for his contributions to the kinetic theory of gases and solar-terrestrial physics, George Temple (1953-1968), who made significant contributions to mathematical physics and the theory of generalized functions, Brooke Benjamin (1979-1995), who did highly influential work in the areas of mathematical analysis and fluid mechanics, and Sir John Ball (1996-2019), who is distinguished for his work in the mathematical theory of elasticity, materials science, the calculus of variations, and infinite-dimensional dynamical systems.

== List of Sedleian Professors ==
Details about the professors
Name	Years	Education	College as Professor	Notes
Edward Lapworth	1621–38	Oxford (St Alban Hall)	Magdalen College	Lapworth was admitted B.A. at St Alban Hall, Oxford on 25 October 1592, and M.A. 30 June 1595. From 1598 to 1610 he was Master of Magdalen College School. As a member of Magdalen College, Lapworth supplicated for the degree of M.B. and for licence to practise medicine 1 March 1602–3. He was licensed on 3 June 1605, and was admitted M.B. and M.D. on 20 June 1611. Lapworth was moderator in vesperiis in medicine in 1605 and 1611, and respondent in natural philosophy on James I's visit to Oxford in 1605. Lapworth was designated first Sedleian reader in natural philosophy under the will of the founder, William Sedley.
John Edwards	1638–48	Oxford (St John's College)	St John's College	In 1617, Edwards was given a fellowship at St John's College, Oxford. The former President of the college, William Laud, in 1632 proposed Edwards as successor for the Headship of Merchant Taylor's School. He left this role at the end of 1634, and went back to Oxford. Edwards proceeded to the role of proctor, and in 1638 was appointed Sedleian reader, gaining the degrees of M.B. and M.D.
Joshua Crosse	1648–60	Oxford (Magdalen Hall)	Magdalen College	Crosse matriculated from Magdalen Hall, Oxford in 1632, and graduated B.A. in 1634. Was elected fellow at Lincoln College, Oxford in 1642. He was nominated as delegate for the aid of parliamentary visitors at Oxford in 1647, and in 1648 was made proctor at Oxford and awarded a fellowship and the Sedleian professorship at Magdalen College.
Thomas Willis	1660–75	Oxford (Christ Church)	Christ Church	Willis was a kinsman of the Willys Baronets of Fen Ditton, Cambridgeshire. He graduated M.A. from Christ Church, Oxford in 1642, and in the 1640s was one of the royal physicians to Charles I of England. One of several Oxford cliques of those interested in science grew up around Willis and Christ Church. Besides Robert Hooke, whom Willis employed as an assistant, others in the group were Nathaniel Hodges, John Locke, Richard Lower, Henry Stubbe and John Ward. (Locke went on to study with Thomas Sydenham, who would become Willis's leading rival, and with whom, both politically and medically, he held some incompatible views.) In the broader Oxford scene, he was a member of the "Oxford Club" of experimentalists with Ralph Bathurst, Robert Boyle, William Petty, John Wilkins and Christopher Wren. In 1656 and 1659 he published two significant medical works, De Fermentatione and De Febribus. These were followed by the 1664 volume on the brain, which was a record of collaborative experimental work. From 1660 until his death, he was appointed to the Sedleian professorship. He was also a founding member of the Royal Society. Willis later worked as a physician in Westminster, London, this coming about after he treated Gilbert Sheldon, Archbishop of Canterbury, in 1666. He had a successful medical practice, in which he applied both his understanding of anatomy and known remedies, attempting to integrate the two. He mixed both iatrochemical and mechanical views.
Thomas Millington	1675–1704	Cambridge (Trinity College)	All Souls College	A physician, Millington was present at the deathbed of Charles II, and was one of the physicians who dissected the body of William III. He was also physician to Mary II, and Queen Anne. A conversation Millington had with Nehemiah Grew, and a proposition Millington put to him, led to Grew's groundbreaking botanical discovery that the stamen is the male sex organ in plants and the pistil the female.
James Fayrer	1704–19	Oxford (St Edmund Hall)	Magdalen College	Fayrer had matriculated at St Edmund Hall in 1672, and was a demy scholar of Magdalen College from 1674 to 1683. Graduating with a BA in 1676, he was elected to a fellowship at Magdalen in 1683, and received the degrees of Bachelor of Divinity (1690) and Doctor of Divinity (1704). He was Sedleian Professor of Natural Philosophy in 1704, serving until his death on 22 February 1719/20. He had briefly been Rector of Appleton between 1709 and 1710.
Charles Bertie	1719–41	Oxford (Christ Church)	All Souls College	Bertie was notoriously awarded the Sedleian readership despite no visible skill in the area. The appointment was rather to level his debts with his college.
Joseph Browne	1741–67	Oxford (Queen's College)	Queen's College	After rising to the Sedleian professorship in 1746, Browne was given prebendary of Hereford Cathedral and in 1752 its chancellorship. From 1759 to 1765 he was Vice-Chancellor of Oxford University.
Benjamin Wheeler	1767–82	Oxford (Trinity College)	Magdalen College	Fellow of Magdalen College. Also Professor of Poetry (1766–76), Regius Professor of Divinity (1776–83), and Chancellor of the Diocese of Oxford.
Thomas Hornsby	1782–1810	Oxford (Corpus Christi College)	Corpus Christi College	A celebrated astronomer, Hornsby made tens of thousands of astronomical observations in his lifetime, and was vital in the creation of the Radcliffe Observatory in 1772. In 1783, he became Radcliffe Librarian, and was appointed Foreign Honorary Member of the American Academy of Arts and Sciences in 1788. The crater Hornsby on the moon is named after him.
George Leigh Cooke	1810–53	Oxford (Balliol College)	Corpus Christi College	Cooke was Keeper of the Archives at Oxford between 1818 and 1826, and, being a naturally outgoing person with an animated personality, was regarded as one of the leading players in the Literary Dining Club for Oxford academics.
Bartholomew Price	1853–98	Oxford (Pembroke College)	Pembroke College	Price published treatises on Differential calculus (in 1848) and Infinitesimal calculus (4 vols., 1852–1860), which were long-standing mainstays of reading lists on those subjects. Price taught Lewis Carroll, and his nickname 'the bat' is immortalised in the Mad Hatter's song, “Twinkle, Twinkle, Little Bat”, a parody of “Twinkle, Twinkle, Little Star”, in Alice's Adventures in Wonderland.
Augustus Love	1899–1940	Cambridge (St John's College)	Queen's College	Love was distinguished for his work on the mathematical theory of elasticity and wave propagation. His research on the structure of the Earth, in which he developed Love Waves, gained him the Adams Prize in 1911. Love also furthered the theory of tidal locking and devised the parameters known as Love numbers. He served as the president of the London Mathematical Society (1912–13), was a Fellow of the Royal Society, and was awarded numerous other distinctions, including a Royal Medal (1909), the De Morgan Medal (1926) and the Sylvester Medal (1937).
Sydney Chapman	1946–53	University of Manchester	Queen's College	Chapman was distinguished for his work on stochastic processes. Chapman and Andrey Kolmogorov independently developed one of the pivotal equations in the field, the Chapman–Kolmogorov equation. He is credited with working out the photochemical mechanisms that give rise to the ozone layer. He is also recognised as one of the pioneers of solar-terrestrial physics, where his contributions include predicting the presence of the magnetosphere in the early 1930s. Chapman gained many honours including election as a Fellow of the Royal Society, a Royal Medal (1934), the De Morgan Medal (1944), the Copley Medal (1964) and the Symons Gold Medal of the Royal Meteorological Society (1965). He was elected to the National Academies of Science of the United States, Norway, Sweden and Finland.[6] He served as president of the London Mathematical Society (1929–1931) and the Royal Meteorological Society (1932–1933). The lunar Crater Chapman is named in his honour. The American Geophysical Union organises "Chapman Conferences," which are named after him. The Royal Astronomical Society founded the Chapman Medal in his memory.
George Frederick James Temple	1953–68	London (Birkbeck College)	Queen's College	Temple made significant contributions to mathematical physics and the theory of generalized functions. He was elected a Fellow of the Royal Society and was awarded its Sylvester Medal in 1969. He was president of the London Mathematical Society (1951-1953). A devout Christian, in 1980 he took monastic vows in the Benedictine order and entered Quarr Abbey on the Isle of Wight, where he remained until his death.
Albert Green	1968–79	Cambridge (Jesus)	Queen's College	Green was one of the most distinguished British applied mathematicians of the twentieth century. His intellectual energy and passion for research were unwavering in a career extending over 63 years. His published work covers a very wide field and includes important contributions to the theoretical mechanics of solids and fluids and the general theory of continuous media. Over the first part of his career Green established a formidable reputation as a problem solver in classical branches of theoretical mechanics. Thereafter he became a leading figure in the modern revival of continuum mechanics and thermomechanics. The extent of the change was regretted by some of his British contemporaries because of what was seen as an abandonment of areas of practical significance for abstract theory. This view is scarcely borne out by a study of his writings, which show a taste for generality but not abstraction. Most of the areas in which he worked were related to aspects of the behaviour of actual materials and, whatever the degree of elaboration of the basic theoretical developments, there was a constant concern for applications, pursued in many cases to the solution of specific problems. His was a scientific journey of remarkable variety and boldness.
Brooke Benjamin	1979–95	University of Liverpool	Queen's College	Benjamin was a mathematical physicist and mathematician, best known for his work in mathematical analysis and fluid mechanics, especially in applications of nonlinear partial differential equations. His numerous important contributions include the Benjamin–Ono equation and the Benjamin–Feir instability. Benjamin received many honours for his achievements, including election to the Fellowship of the Royal Society and election to the Académie des Sciences of Paris. He gave the Royal Society's Bakerian lecture in 1992.
John M. Ball	1996–2019	Cambridge (St John's)	Queen's College	Ball is distinguished for his research on elasticity, the calculus of variations, materials science and infinite-dimensional dynamical systems. He was knighted in 2006. He is a Fellow of the Royal Society, and a past president of the London Mathematical Society (1996-1998) and the International Mathematical Union (2003-2006). His many awards include the Theodore von Kármán Prize (1999), and the Sylvester Medal (2009). In 2018 he received the King Faisal International Prize in Mathematics.
Jonathan Keating	2019–	University of Bristol	Queen's College	Keating has wide-ranging interests but is best known for his research in random matrix theory and its applications to quantum chaos, number theory, and the Riemann zeta function.

== Bibliography ==
- Oxford Dictionary of National Biography, articles on Lapworth, Edwards, Wallis, Millington, Browne, Hornsby, Cooke, Price, Love, Chapman, Temple, Brook Benjamin.
