= Chillingwood Manor =

Manor in the Isle of Wight

Chillingwood Manor (also Chellingwood and Chelyngwod) is a manor house on the Isle of Wight, situated within the Newchurch parish.

== History ==
It was held of the honour of Carisbrooke Castle. Geoffrey de Chillingwood held it for the service of a thirteenth part of a knight's fee in 1262–3, and Roger de Chillingwood was in possession at the end of the century and at the beginning of the 14th. Robert de Barton is returned in 1346 as the holder. Chillingwood passed with Barton's other estates to the Raleighs of Walpen, but another estate at Chillingwood belonged in the 14th century to the Gorges of Knighton, and descended with Knighton to the Gilberts. The Raleighs' estate followed the same descent as Walpen to George Raleigh, who died in 1545–6. The whole was probably acquired by Thomas Cotele, as it was held in the 18th century by the Edgcumbe family and sold in 1787 by George Lord Mount Edgcumbe. As of 1912 it was owned by Mr. Edward Carter of East Upton, Ryde.
