= Kirchhoff–Love plate theory =

Theory used to determine the stresses and deformations in thin plates

Deformation of a thin plate highlighting the displacement, the mid-surface (red) and the normal to the mid-surface (blue)

The Kirchhoff–Love theory of plates is a two-dimensional mathematical model that is used to determine the stresses and deformations in thin plates subjected to forces and moments. This theory is an extension of Euler–Bernoulli beam theory and was developed in 1888 by Augustus Edward Hough Love using assumptions proposed by Gustav Kirchhoff. The theory assumes that a mid-surface plane can be used to represent a three-dimensional plate in two-dimensional form.

The following kinematic assumptions that are made in this theory:

- straight lines normal to the mid-surface remain straight after deformation
- straight lines normal to the mid-surface remain normal to the mid-surface after deformation
- the thickness of the plate does not change during a deformation.

== Assumed displacement field ==
Let the position vector of a point in the undeformed plate be $\mathbf{x}$. Then

$$\mathbf{x} = x_1\boldsymbol{e}_1+x_2\boldsymbol{e}_2+x_3\boldsymbol{e}_3 \equiv x_i\boldsymbol{e}_i\,.$$

The vectors $\boldsymbol{e}_i$ form a Cartesian basis with origin on the mid-surface of the plate, $x_1$ and $x_2$ are the Cartesian coordinates on the mid-surface of the undeformed plate, and $x_3$ is the coordinate for the thickness direction.

Let the displacement of a point in the plate be $\mathbf{u}(\mathbf{x})$. Then

$$\mathbf{u} = u_1\boldsymbol{e}_1+u_2\boldsymbol{e}_2+u_3\boldsymbol{e}_3 \equiv u_i\boldsymbol{e}_i$$

This displacement can be decomposed into a vector sum of the mid-surface displacement $u^0_\alpha$ and an out-of-plane displacement $w^0$ in the $x_3$ direction. We can write the in-plane displacement of the mid-surface as

$$\mathbf{u}^0 = u^0_1\boldsymbol{e}_1+u^0_2\boldsymbol{e}_2 \equiv u^0_\alpha\boldsymbol{e}_\alpha$$

Note that the index $\alpha$ takes the values 1 and 2 but not 3.

Then the Kirchhoff hypothesis implies that

$$\begin{align}
u_\alpha(\mathbf{x}) & = u^0_\alpha(x_1,x_2) - x_3~\frac{\partial w^0}{\partial x_\alpha} \equiv u^0_\alpha - x_3~w^0_{,\alpha} ~;~~\alpha=1,2 \\
u_3(\mathbf{x}) & = w^0(x_1, x_2)
\end{align}$$

If $\varphi_\alpha$ are the angles of rotation of the normal to the mid-surface, then in the Kirchhoff-Love theory

$$\varphi_\alpha = w^0_{,\alpha}$$

Note that we can think of the expression for $u_\alpha$ as the first order Taylor series expansion of the displacement around the mid-surface.

Displacement of the mid-surface (left) and of a normal (right)

== Quasistatic Kirchhoff–Love plates ==
The original theory developed by Love was valid for infinitesimal strains and rotations. The theory was extended by von Kármán to situations where moderate rotations could be expected.

=== Strain-displacement relations ===
For the situation where the strains in the plate are infinitesimal and the rotations of the mid-surface normals are less than 10° the strain-displacement relations are

$$\begin{align}
\varepsilon_{\alpha\beta} & = \frac{1}{2}\left(\frac{\partial u_\alpha}{\partial x_\beta} +
\frac{\partial u_\beta}{\partial x_\alpha}\right) \equiv \frac{1}{2}(u_{\alpha,\beta}+u_{\beta,\alpha})\\
\varepsilon_{\alpha 3} & = \frac{1}{2}\left(\frac{\partial u_\alpha}{\partial x_3} +
\frac{\partial u_3}{\partial x_\alpha}\right) \equiv \frac{1}{2}(u_{\alpha,3}+u_{3,\alpha})\\
\varepsilon_{33} & = \frac{\partial u_3}{\partial x_3} \equiv u_{3,3}
\end{align}$$

where $\beta=1, 2$ as $\alpha$.

Using the kinematic assumptions we have

$$\begin{align}
\varepsilon_{\alpha\beta} & = \tfrac{1}{2}(u^0_{\alpha,\beta}+u^0_{\beta,\alpha})
- x_3~w^0_{,\alpha\beta} \\
\varepsilon_{\alpha 3} & = - w^0_{,\alpha} + w^0_{,\alpha} = 0 \\
\varepsilon_{33} & = 0
\end{align}$$

Therefore, the only non-zero strains are in the in-plane directions.

=== Equilibrium equations ===
The equilibrium equations for the plate can be derived from the principle of virtual work. For a thin plate under a quasistatic transverse load $q(x)$ pointing towards positive $x_3$ direction, these equations are

$$\begin{align}
&\cfrac{\partial N_{11}}{\partial x_1} + \cfrac{\partial N_{21}}{\partial x_2} = 0 \\
&\cfrac{\partial N_{12}}{\partial x_1} + \cfrac{\partial N_{22}}{\partial x_2} = 0\\
&\cfrac{\partial^2 M_{11}}{\partial x_1^2} + 2\cfrac{\partial^2 M_{12}}{\partial x_1 \partial x_2} +
\cfrac{\partial^2 M_{22}}{\partial x_2^2} = -q
\end{align}$$

where the thickness of the plate is $2h$. In index notation,

$$\begin{align}
N_{\alpha\beta,\alpha} & = 0 \quad  \quad N_{\alpha\beta} := \int_{-h}^h \sigma_{\alpha\beta}~dx_3 \\
M_{\alpha\beta,\alpha\beta} + q & = 0 \quad  \quad M_{\alpha\beta} := \int_{-h}^h x_3~\sigma_{\alpha\beta}~dx_3
\end{align}$$

where $\sigma_{\alpha\beta}$ are the stresses.

Bending moments and normal stresses

Torques and shear stresses

Derivation of equilibrium equations for small rotations
For the situation where the strains and rotations of the plate are small the virtual internal energy is given by

$$\begin{align}
\delta U & = \int_{\Omega^0} \int_{-h}^h \boldsymbol{\sigma}:\delta\boldsymbol{\epsilon}~dx_3~d\Omega
= \int_{\Omega^0} \int_{-h}^h \sigma_{\alpha\beta}~\delta\varepsilon_{\alpha\beta}~dx_3~d\Omega \\
& = \int_{\Omega^0} \int_{-h}^h \left[\frac{1}{2}~\sigma_{\alpha\beta}~(\delta u^0_{\alpha,\beta}+\delta u^0_{\beta,\alpha}) - x_3~\sigma_{\alpha\beta}~\delta w^0_{,\alpha\beta}\right]~dx_3~d\Omega \\
& = \int_{\Omega^0} \left[\frac{1}{2}~N_{\alpha\beta}~(\delta u^0_{\alpha,\beta}+\delta u^0_{\beta,\alpha}) - M_{\alpha\beta}~\delta w^0_{,\alpha\beta}\right]~d\Omega
\end{align}$$

where the thickness of the plate is $2h$ and the stress resultants and stress moment resultants are defined as

$$N_{\alpha\beta} := \int_{-h}^h \sigma_{\alpha\beta}~dx_3 ~;~~
M_{\alpha\beta} := \int_{-h}^h x_3~\sigma_{\alpha\beta}~dx_3$$

Integration by parts leads to

$$\begin{align}
\delta U & = \int_{\Omega^0} \left[-\frac{1}{2}~(N_{\alpha\beta,\beta}~\delta u^0_{\alpha}+N_{\alpha\beta,\alpha}~\delta u^0_{\beta})
+ M_{\alpha\beta,\beta}~\delta w^0_{,\alpha}\right]~d\Omega \\
& + \int_{\Gamma^0} \left[\frac{1}{2}~(n_\beta~N_{\alpha\beta}~\delta u^0_\alpha+n_\alpha~N_{\alpha\beta}~\delta u^0_{\beta})
- n_\beta~M_{\alpha\beta}~\delta w^0_{,\alpha}\right]~d\Gamma
\end{align}$$

The symmetry of the stress tensor implies that $N_{\alpha\beta} = N_{\beta\alpha}$. Hence,

$$\delta U = \int_{\Omega^0} \left[-N_{\alpha\beta,\alpha}~\delta u^0_{\beta}
+ M_{\alpha\beta,\beta}~\delta w^0_{,\alpha}\right]~d\Omega
+ \int_{\Gamma^0} \left[n_\alpha~N_{\alpha\beta}~\delta u^0_{\beta}
- n_\beta~M_{\alpha\beta}~\delta w^0_{,\alpha}\right]~d\Gamma$$

Another integration by parts gives

$$\delta U = \int_{\Omega^0} \left[-N_{\alpha\beta,\alpha}~\delta u^0_{\beta}
- M_{\alpha\beta,\beta\alpha}~\delta w^0\right]~d\Omega
+ \int_{\Gamma^0} \left[n_\alpha~N_{\alpha\beta}~\delta u^0_{\beta}
+ n_\alpha~M_{\alpha\beta,\beta}~\delta w^0
- n_\beta~M_{\alpha\beta}~\delta w^0_{,\alpha}\right]~d\Gamma$$

For the case where there are no prescribed external forces, the principle of virtual work implies that $\delta U =0$. The equilibrium equations for the plate are then given by

$$\begin{align}
N_{\alpha\beta,\alpha} & = 0 \\
M_{\alpha\beta,\alpha\beta} & = 0
\end{align}$$

If the plate is loaded by an external distributed load $q(x)$ that is normal to the mid-surface and directed in the positive $x_3$ direction, the external virtual work due to the load is

$$\delta V_{\mathrm{ext}} = \int_{\Omega^0} q~\delta w^0~d\Omega$$

The principle of virtual work $\delta U = \delta V_{\mathrm{ext}}$ then leads to the equilibrium equations

$$\begin{align}
N_{\alpha\beta,\alpha} & = 0 \\
M_{\alpha\beta,\alpha\beta} + q & = 0
\end{align}$$

=== Boundary conditions ===
The boundary conditions that are needed to solve the equilibrium equations of plate theory can be obtained from the boundary terms in the principle of virtual work. In the absence of external forces on the boundary, the boundary conditions are

$$\begin{align}
n_\alpha~N_{\alpha\beta} & \quad \mathrm{or} \quad u^0_\beta \\
n_\alpha~M_{\alpha\beta,\beta} & \quad \mathrm{or} \quad w^0 \\
n_\beta~M_{\alpha\beta} & \quad \mathrm{or} \quad w^0_{,\alpha}
\end{align}$$

Note that the quantity $n_\alpha~M_{\alpha\beta,\beta}$ is an effective shear force.

=== Constitutive relations ===
The stress-strain relations for a linear elastic Kirchhoff plate are given by

$$\begin{align}
\sigma_{\alpha\beta} & = C_{\alpha\beta\gamma\theta}~\varepsilon_{\gamma\theta} \\
\sigma_{\alpha 3} & = C_{\alpha 3\gamma\theta}~\varepsilon_{\gamma\theta} \\
\sigma_{33} & = C_{33\gamma\theta}~\varepsilon_{\gamma\theta}
\end{align}$$

Since $\sigma_{\alpha 3}$ and $\sigma_{33}$ do not appear in the equilibrium equations it is implicitly assumed that these quantities do not have any effect on the momentum balance and are neglected. The remaining stress-strain relations, in matrix form, can be written as

$$\begin{bmatrix}\sigma_{11} \\ \sigma_{22} \\ \sigma_{12} \end{bmatrix} =
\begin{bmatrix} C_{11} & C_{12} & C_{13} \\ C_{12} & C_{22} & C_{23} \\
C_{13} & C_{23} & C_{33} \end{bmatrix}
\begin{bmatrix}\varepsilon_{11} \\ \varepsilon_{22} \\ \varepsilon_{12} \end{bmatrix}$$

Then,

$$\begin{bmatrix}N_{11} \\ N_{22} \\ N_{12} \end{bmatrix} =
\int_{-h}^h \begin{bmatrix} C_{11} & C_{12} & C_{13} \\ C_{12} & C_{22} & C_{23} \\
C_{13} & C_{23} & C_{33} \end{bmatrix}
\begin{bmatrix}\varepsilon_{11} \\ \varepsilon_{22} \\ \varepsilon_{12} \end{bmatrix}
dx_3 = \left\{
\int_{-h}^h \begin{bmatrix} C_{11} & C_{12} & C_{13} \\ C_{12} & C_{22} & C_{23} \\
C_{13} & C_{23} & C_{33} \end{bmatrix}~dx_3 \right\}
\begin{bmatrix} u^0_{1,1} \\ u^0_{2,2} \\ \frac{1}{2}~(u^0_{1,2}+u^0_{2,1}) \end{bmatrix}$$

and

$$\begin{bmatrix}M_{11} \\ M_{22} \\ M_{12} \end{bmatrix} =
\int_{-h}^h x_3~\begin{bmatrix} C_{11} & C_{12} & C_{13} \\ C_{12} & C_{22} & C_{23} \\
C_{13} & C_{23} & C_{33} \end{bmatrix}
\begin{bmatrix}\varepsilon_{11} \\ \varepsilon_{22} \\ \varepsilon_{12} \end{bmatrix}
dx_3 = -\left\{
\int_{-h}^h x_3^2~\begin{bmatrix} C_{11} & C_{12} & C_{13} \\ C_{12} & C_{22} & C_{23} \\
C_{13} & C_{23} & C_{33} \end{bmatrix}~dx_3 \right\}
\begin{bmatrix} w^0_{,11} \\ w^0_{,22} \\ w^0_{,12} \end{bmatrix}$$

The extensional stiffnesses are the quantities

$$A_{\alpha\beta} := \int_{-h}^h C_{\alpha\beta}~dx_3$$

The bending stiffnesses (also called flexural rigidity) are the quantities

$$D_{\alpha\beta} := \int_{-h}^h x_3^2~C_{\alpha\beta}~dx_3$$

The Kirchhoff-Love constitutive assumptions lead to zero shear forces. As a result, the equilibrium equations for the plate have to be used to determine the shear forces in thin Kirchhoff-Love plates. For isotropic plates, these equations lead to

$$Q_\alpha = - D\frac{\partial}{\partial x_\alpha}(\nabla^2 w^0) \,.$$

Alternatively, these shear forces can be expressed as

$$Q_\alpha = \mathcal{M}_{,\alpha}$$

where

$$\mathcal{M} := -D\nabla^2 w^0 \,.$$

=== Small strains and moderate rotations ===
If the rotations of the normals to the mid-surface are in the range of 10$^{\circ}$ to 15$^\circ$, the strain-displacement relations can be approximated as

$$\begin{align}
\varepsilon_{\alpha\beta} & =  \tfrac{1}{2}(u_{\alpha,\beta}+u_{\beta,\alpha}+u_{3,\alpha}~u_{3,\beta})\\
\varepsilon_{\alpha 3} & = \tfrac{1}{2}(u_{\alpha,3}+u_{3,\alpha})\\
\varepsilon_{33} & = u_{3,3}
\end{align}$$

Then the kinematic assumptions of Kirchhoff-Love theory lead to the classical plate theory with von Kármán strains

$$\begin{align}
\varepsilon_{\alpha\beta} & = \frac{1}{2}(u^0_{\alpha,\beta}+u^0_{\beta,\alpha}+w^0_{,\alpha}~w^0_{,\beta})
- x_3~w^0_{,\alpha\beta} \\
\varepsilon_{\alpha 3} & = - w^0_{,\alpha} + w^0_{,\alpha} = 0 \\
\varepsilon_{33} & = 0
\end{align}$$

This theory is nonlinear because of the quadratic terms in the strain-displacement relations.

If the strain-displacement relations take the von Karman form, the equilibrium equations can be expressed as

$$\begin{align}
N_{\alpha\beta,\alpha} & = 0 \\
M_{\alpha\beta,\alpha\beta} + [N_{\alpha\beta}~w^0_{,\beta}]_{,\alpha} + q & = 0
\end{align}$$

== Isotropic quasistatic Kirchhoff-Love plates ==
For an isotropic and homogeneous plate, the stress-strain relations are

$$\begin{bmatrix}\sigma_{11} \\ \sigma_{22} \\ \sigma_{12} \end{bmatrix}
= \cfrac{E}{1-\nu^2}
\begin{bmatrix} 1 & \nu & 0 \\
\nu & 1 & 0 \\
0 & 0 & 1-\nu \end{bmatrix}
\begin{bmatrix}\varepsilon_{11} \\ \varepsilon_{22} \\ \varepsilon_{12} \end{bmatrix} \,.$$

where $\nu$ is Poisson's Ratio and $E$ is Young's Modulus. The moments corresponding to these stresses are

$$\begin{bmatrix}M_{11} \\ M_{22} \\ M_{12} \end{bmatrix} =
-\cfrac{2h^3E}{3(1-\nu^2)}~\begin{bmatrix} 1 & \nu & 0 \\
\nu & 1 & 0 \\
0 & 0 & {1-\nu} \end{bmatrix}
\begin{bmatrix} w^0_{,11} \\ w^0_{,22} \\ w^0_{,12} \end{bmatrix}$$

In expanded form,

$$\begin{align}
M_{11} & = -D\left(\frac{\partial^2 w^0}{\partial x_1^2} + \nu \frac{\partial^2 w^0}{\partial x_2^2}\right) \\
M_{22} & = -D\left(\frac{\partial^2 w^0}{\partial x_2^2} + \nu \frac{\partial^2 w^0}{\partial x_1^2}\right) \\
M_{12} & = -D(1-\nu)\frac{\partial^2 w^0}{\partial x_1 \partial x_2}
\end{align}$$

where $D = 2h^3E/[3(1-\nu^2)] = H^3E/[12(1-\nu^2)]$ for plates of thickness $H = 2h$. Using the stress-strain relations for the plates, we can show that the stresses and moments are related by

$$\sigma_{11} = \frac{3x_3}{2h^3}\,M_{11} = \frac{12 x_3}{H^3}\,M_{11} \quad \text{and} \quad
\sigma_{22} = \frac{3x_3}{2h^3}\,M_{22} = \frac{12 x_3}{H^3}\,M_{22} \,.$$

At the top of the plate where $x_3 = h = H/2$, the stresses are

$$\sigma_{11} = \frac{3}{2h^2}\,M_{11} = \frac{6}{H^2}\,M_{11} \quad \text{and} \quad
\sigma_{22} = \frac{3}{2h^2}\,M_{22} = \frac{6}{H^2}\,M_{22} \,.$$

=== Pure bending ===
For an isotropic and homogeneous plate under pure bending, the governing equations reduce to

$$\frac{\partial^4 w^0}{\partial x_1^4} + 2\frac{\partial^4 w^0}{\partial x_1^2  \partial x_2^2} + \frac{\partial^4 w^0}{\partial x_2^4} = 0 \,.$$

Here we have assumed that the in-plane displacements do not vary with $x_1$ and $x_2$. In index notation,

$$w^0_{,1111} + 2~w^0_{,1212} +  w^0_{,2222} = 0$$

and in direct notation

$\nabla^2\nabla^2 w = 0$

which is known as the biharmonic equation. The bending moments are given by

$$\begin{bmatrix}M_{11} \\ M_{22} \\ M_{12} \end{bmatrix} =
-\cfrac{2h^3E}{3(1-\nu^2)}~\begin{bmatrix} 1 & \nu & 0 \\
\nu & 1 & 0 \\
0 & 0 & 1-\nu \end{bmatrix}
\begin{bmatrix} w^0_{,11} \\ w^0_{,22} \\ w^0_{,12} \end{bmatrix}$$

Derivation of equilibrium equations for pure bending
For an isotropic, homogeneous plate under pure bending the governing equations are

$$\begin{align}
N_{\alpha\beta,\alpha} & = 0 \implies N_{11,1} + N_{21,2} = 0 ~,~~ N_{12,1} + N_{22,2} = 0 \\
M_{\alpha\beta,\alpha\beta} & = 0 \implies M_{11,11} + 2 M_{12,12} + M_{22,22} = 0
\end{align}$$

and the stress-strain relations are

$$\begin{bmatrix}\sigma_{11} \\ \sigma_{22} \\ \sigma_{12} \end{bmatrix}
= \cfrac{E}{1-\nu^2}
\begin{bmatrix} 1 & \nu & 0 \\
\nu & 1 & 0 \\
0 & 0 & 1-\nu \end{bmatrix}
\begin{bmatrix}\varepsilon_{11} \\ \varepsilon_{22} \\ \varepsilon_{12} \end{bmatrix}$$

Then,

$$\begin{bmatrix}N_{11} \\ N_{22} \\ N_{12} \end{bmatrix} =
\cfrac{2hE}{(1-\nu^2)}~\begin{bmatrix} 1 & \nu & 0 \\
\nu & 1 & 0 \\
0 & 0 & 1-\nu \end{bmatrix}
\begin{bmatrix} u^0_{1,1} \\ u^0_{2,2} \\ \frac{1}{2}~(u^0_{1,2}+u^0_{2,1}) \end{bmatrix}$$

and

$$\begin{bmatrix}M_{11} \\ M_{22} \\ M_{12} \end{bmatrix} =
-\cfrac{2h^3E}{3(1-\nu^2)}~\begin{bmatrix} 1 & \nu & 0 \\
\nu & 1 & 0 \\
0 & 0 & 1-\nu \end{bmatrix}
\begin{bmatrix} w^0_{,11} \\ w^0_{,22} \\ w^0_{,12} \end{bmatrix}$$

Differentiation gives

$$\begin{align}
N_{11,1} & = \cfrac{2hE}{(1-\nu^2)}\left(u^0_{1,11} + \nu~u^0_{2,21}\right) ~;~~
N_{22,2}  = \cfrac{2hE}{(1-\nu^2)}\left(\nu~u^0_{1,12} + u^0_{2,22}\right) \\
N_{12,1} & = \cfrac{hE(1-\nu)}{(1-\nu^2)}\left(u^0_{1,21}+u^0_{2,11}\right) ~;~~
N_{12,2} = \cfrac{hE(1-\nu)}{(1-\nu^2)}\left(u^0_{1,22}+u^0_{2,12}\right)
\end{align}$$

and

$$\begin{align}
M_{11,11} & = -\cfrac{2h^3E}{3(1-\nu^2)}\left( w^0_{,1111} + \nu~w^0_{,2211}\right) \\
M_{22,22} & = -\cfrac{2h^3E}{3(1-\nu^2)}\left( \nu~w^0_{,1122} + w^0_{,2222}\right) \\
M_{12,12} & = -\cfrac{2h^3E}{3(1-\nu^2)}(1-\nu)~w^0_{,1212}
\end{align}$$

Plugging into the governing equations leads to

$$\begin{align}
& u^0_{1,11} + \nu~u^0_{2,21} + \tfrac{1}{2}(1-\nu)\left(u^0_{1,22}+u^0_{2,12}\right) = 0 \\
& \nu~u^0_{1,12} + u^0_{2,22} + \tfrac{1}{2}(1-\nu)\left(u^0_{1,21}+u^0_{2,11}\right) = 0 \\
& w^0_{,1111} + \nu~w^0_{,2211} + 2(1-\nu)~w^0_{,1212} +  \nu~w^0_{,1122} + w^0_{,2222} = 0
\end{align}$$

Since the order of differentiation is irrelevant we have $u^0_{1,12}=u^0_{1,21}$, $u^0_{2,21}=u^0_{2,12}$, and $w^0_{,2211} = w^0_{,1212} = w^0_{,1122}$. Hence

$$\begin{align}
& u^0_{1,11} + \tfrac{1}{2}(1-\nu)~u^0_{1,22} + \tfrac{1}{2}(1+\nu)~u^0_{2,12} = 0 \\
& u^0_{2,22} + \tfrac{1}{2}(1-\nu)~u^0_{2,11} + \tfrac{1}{2}(1+\nu)~u^0_{1,12} = 0 \\
& w^0_{,1111} + 2~w^0_{,1212} +  w^0_{,2222} = 0
\end{align}$$

In direct tensor notation, the governing equation of the plate is

$$\nabla^2\nabla^2 w = 0$$

where we have assumed that the displacements $u^0_1,u^0_2$ are constant.

=== Bending under transverse load ===
If a distributed transverse load $q(x)$ pointing along positive $x_3$ direction is applied to the plate, the governing equation is $M_{\alpha\beta,\alpha\beta} = -q$. Following the procedure shown in the previous section we get

$\nabla^2\nabla^2 w = \cfrac{q}{D} ~;~~ D := \cfrac{2h^3E}{3(1-\nu^2)}$

In rectangular Cartesian coordinates, the governing equation is

$$w^0_{,1111} + 2\,w^0_{,1212} + w^0_{,2222} = \cfrac{q}{D}$$

and in cylindrical coordinates it takes the form

$$\frac{1}{r}\cfrac{d }{d r}\left[r \cfrac{d }{d r}\left\{\frac{1}{r}\cfrac{d }{d r}\left(r \cfrac{d w}{d r}\right)\right\}\right] = \frac{q}{D}\,.$$

Solutions of this equation for various geometries and boundary conditions can be found in the article on bending of plates.

Derivation of equilibrium equations for transverse loading
For a transversely loaded plate without axial deformations, the governing equation has the form

$$M_{\alpha\beta,\alpha\beta} = q \implies M_{11,11} + 2 M_{12,12} + M_{22,22} = q$$

where $q$ is a distributed transverse load (per unit area). Substitution of the expressions for the derivatives of $M_{\alpha\beta}$ into the governing equation gives

$$-\cfrac{2h^3E}{3(1-\nu^2)}\left[w^0_{,1111} + 2\,w^0_{,1212} + w^0_{,2222}\right] = q \,.$$

Noting that the bending stiffness is the quantity

$$D := \cfrac{2h^3E}{3(1-\nu^2)}$$

we can write the governing equation in the form
$\nabla^2\nabla^2 w = -\frac{q}{D} \,.$
In cylindrical coordinates $(r, \theta, z)$,

$$\nabla^2 w \equiv \frac{1}{r}\frac{\partial }{\partial r}\left(r \frac{\partial w}{\partial r}\right) +
\frac{1}{r^2}\frac{\partial^2 w}{\partial \theta^2} + \frac{\partial^2 w}{\partial z^2} \,.$$

For symmetrically loaded circular plates, $w = w(r)$, and we have

$$\nabla^2 w \equiv \frac{1}{r}\cfrac{d }{d r}\left(r \cfrac{d w}{d r}\right) \,.$$

=== Cylindrical bending ===
Under certain loading conditions a flat plate can be bent into the shape of the surface of a cylinder. This type of bending is called cylindrical bending and represents the special situation where $u_1 = u_1(x_1), u_2 = 0, w = w(x_1)$. In that case

$$\begin{bmatrix}N_{11} \\ N_{22} \\ N_{12} \end{bmatrix} =
\cfrac{2hE}{(1-\nu^2)}~\begin{bmatrix} 1 & \nu & 0 \\
\nu & 1 & 0 \\
0 & 0 & 1-\nu \end{bmatrix}
\begin{bmatrix} u^0_{1,1} \\ 0 \\ 0 \end{bmatrix}$$

and

$$\begin{bmatrix}M_{11} \\ M_{22} \\ M_{12} \end{bmatrix} =
-\cfrac{2h^3E}{3(1-\nu^2)}~\begin{bmatrix} 1 & \nu & 0 \\
\nu & 1 & 0 \\
0 & 0 & 1-\nu \end{bmatrix}
\begin{bmatrix} w^0_{,11} \\ 0 \\ 0 \end{bmatrix}$$

and the governing equations become

$$\begin{align}
N_{11} & = A~\cfrac{\mathrm{d}u}{\mathrm{d} x_1} \quad \implies \quad
\cfrac{\mathrm{d}^2 u}{\mathrm{d} x_1^2} = 0\\
M_{11} & = -D~\cfrac{\mathrm{d}^2 w}{\mathrm{d} x_1^2} \quad \implies \quad \cfrac{\mathrm{d}^4 w}{\mathrm{d} x_1^4} = \cfrac{q}{D} \\
\end{align}$$

== Dynamics of Kirchhoff-Love plates ==
The dynamic theory of thin plates determines the propagation of waves in the plates, and the study of standing waves and vibration modes.

=== Governing equations ===
The governing equations for the dynamics of a Kirchhoff-Love plate are

$$\begin{align}
N_{\alpha\beta,\beta} & = J_1~\ddot{u}^0_\alpha \\
M_{\alpha\beta,\alpha\beta} + q(x,t) & = J_1~\ddot{w}^0 - J_3~\ddot{w}^0_{,\alpha\alpha}
\end{align}$$

where, for a plate with density $\rho = \rho(x)$,

$$J_1 := \int_{-h}^h \rho~dx_3 = 2~\rho~h ~;~~
J_3 := \int_{-h}^h x_3^2~\rho~dx_3 = \frac{2}{3}~\rho~h^3$$

and

$$\dot{u}_i = \frac{\partial u_i}{\partial t} ~;~~ \ddot{u}_i = \frac{\partial^2 u_i}{\partial t^2} ~;~~
u_{i,\alpha} = \frac{\partial u_i}{\partial x_\alpha} ~;~~ u_{i,\alpha\beta} = \frac{\partial^2 u_i}{\partial x_\alpha \partial x_\beta}$$

Derivation of equations governing the dynamics of Kirchhoff-Love plates
The total kinetic energy (more precisely, action of kinetic energy) of the plate is given by

$$K = \int_0^T \int_{\Omega^0} \int_{-h}^h \cfrac{\rho}{2}\left[
\left(\frac{\partial u_1}{\partial t}\right)^2 + \left(\frac{\partial u_2}{\partial t}\right)^2 +
\left(\frac{\partial u_3}{\partial t}\right)^2\right]~\mathrm{d}x_3~\mathrm{d}A~\mathrm{d}t$$

Therefore, the variation in kinetic energy is

$$\delta K = \int_0^T \int_{\Omega^0} \int_{-h}^h \cfrac{\rho}{2}\left[
2\left(\frac{\partial u_1}{\partial t}\right)\left(\frac{\partial \delta u_1}{\partial t}\right) +
2\left(\frac{\partial u_2}{\partial t}\right)\left(\frac{\partial \delta u_2}{\partial t}\right) +
2\left(\frac{\partial u_3}{\partial t}\right)\left(\frac{\partial \delta u_3}{\partial t}\right) \right]
~\mathrm{d}x_3~\mathrm{d}A~\mathrm{d}t$$

We use the following notation in the rest of this section.

$$\dot{u}_i = \frac{\partial u_i}{\partial t} ~;~~ \ddot{u}_i = \frac{\partial^2 u_i}{\partial t^2} ~;~~
u_{i,\alpha} = \frac{\partial u_i}{\partial x_\alpha} ~;~~ u_{i,\alpha\beta} = \frac{\partial^2 u_i}{\partial x_\alpha \partial x_\beta}$$

Then

$$\delta K = \int_0^T \int_{\Omega^0} \int_{-h}^h \rho \left(
\dot{u}_\alpha~\delta\dot{u}_\alpha + \dot{u}_3~\delta\dot{u}_3\right)
~\mathrm{d}x_3~\mathrm{d}A~\mathrm{d}t$$

For a Kirchhof-Love plate

$$u_\alpha = u^0_\alpha - x_3~w^0_{,\alpha} ~;~~ u_3 = w^0$$

Hence,

$$\begin{align}
\delta K & = \int_0^T \int_{\Omega^0} \int_{-h}^h \rho \left[
\left(\dot{u}^0_\alpha - x_3~\dot{w}^0_{,\alpha}\right)~
\left(\delta\dot{u}^0_\alpha - x_3~\delta\dot{w}^0_{,\alpha}\right)
+ \dot{w}^0~\delta\dot{w}^0\right] ~\mathrm{d}x_3~\mathrm{d}A~\mathrm{d}t \\
& = \int_0^T \int_{\Omega^0} \int_{-h}^h \rho
\left(\dot{u}^0_\alpha~\delta\dot{u}^0_\alpha
- x_3~\dot{w}^0_{,\alpha}~ \delta\dot{u}^0_\alpha
- x_3~\dot{u}^0_\alpha~\delta\dot{w}^0_{,\alpha}
+ x_3^2~\dot{w}^0_{,\alpha}~\delta\dot{w}^0_{,\alpha}
+ \dot{w}^0~\delta\dot{w}^0\right) ~\mathrm{d}x_3~\mathrm{d}A~\mathrm{d}t
\end{align}$$

Define, for constant $\rho$ through the thickness of the plate,

$$J_1 := \int_{-h}^h \rho~dx_3 = 2~\rho~h ~;~~
J_2 := \int_{-h}^h x_3~\rho~dx_3 = 0 ~;~~ J_3 := \int_{-h}^h x_3^2~\rho~dx_3 = \frac{2}{3}~\rho~h^3$$

Then

$$\delta K =
\int_0^T \int_{\Omega^0} \left[
J_1\left(\dot{u}^0_\alpha~\delta\dot{u}^0_\alpha
+ \dot{w}^0~\delta\dot{w}^0\right)
+ J_3~\dot{w}^0_{,\alpha}~\delta\dot{w}^0_{,\alpha}\right]
~\mathrm{d}A~\mathrm{d}t$$

Integrating by parts,

$$\delta K =
\int_{\Omega^0} \left[\int_0^T \left\{
- J_1\left(\ddot{u}^0_{\alpha}~\delta u^0_\alpha
+ \ddot{w}^0~\delta w^0\right)
- J_3~\ddot{w}^0_{,\alpha}~\delta w^0_{,\alpha}\right\}~\mathrm{d}t
+ \left|J_1\left(\dot{u}^0_{\alpha}~\delta u^0_\alpha
+ \dot{w}^0~\delta w^0\right)
+ J_3~\dot{w}^0_{,\alpha}~\delta w^0_{,\alpha}\right|_0^T
\right]~\mathrm{d}A$$

The variations $\delta u^0_\alpha$ and $\delta w^0$ are zero at $t = 0$ and $t = T$. Hence, after switching the sequence of integration, we have

$$\delta K =
-\int_0^T \left\{ \int_{\Omega^0} \left[
J_1\left(\ddot{u}^0_{\alpha}~\delta u^0_\alpha
+ \ddot{w}^0~\delta w^0\right)
+ J_3~\ddot{w}^0_{,\alpha}~\delta w^0_{,\alpha}\right]
~\mathrm{d}A\right\}~\mathrm{d}t
+ \left| \int_{\Omega^0} J_3~\dot{w}^0_{,\alpha}~\delta w^0_{,\alpha}\mathrm{d}A\right|_0^T$$

Integration by parts over the mid-surface gives

$$\begin{align}
\delta K & =
-\int_0^T \left\{ \int_{\Omega^0} \left[
J_1\left(\ddot{u}^0_{\alpha}~\delta u^0_\alpha
+ \ddot{w}^0~\delta w^0\right)
- J_3~\ddot{w}^0_{,\alpha\alpha}~\delta w^0\right] ~\mathrm{d}A
+ \int_{\Gamma^0} J_3~n_\alpha~\ddot{w}^0_{,\alpha}~\delta w^0~\mathrm{d}s
\right\}~\mathrm{d}t \\
& \qquad
- \left| \int_{\Omega^0} J_3~\dot{w}^0_{,\alpha\alpha}~\delta w^0~\mathrm{d}A
- \int_{\Gamma^0} J_3~\dot{w}^0_{,\alpha}~\delta w^0~\mathrm{d}s \right|_0^T
\end{align}$$

Again, since the variations are zero at the beginning and the end of the time interval under consideration, we have

$$\delta K =
-\int_0^T \left\{ \int_{\Omega^0} \left[
J_1\left(\ddot{u}^0_{\alpha}~\delta u^0_\alpha
+ \ddot{w}^0~\delta w^0\right)
- J_3~\ddot{w}^0_{,\alpha\alpha}~\delta w^0\right] ~\mathrm{d}A
+ \int_{\Gamma^0} J_3~n_\alpha~\ddot{w}^0_{,\alpha}~\delta w^0~\mathrm{d}s
\right\}~\mathrm{d}t$$

For the dynamic case, the variation in the internal energy is given by

$$\delta U = - \int_0^T \left\{\int_{\Omega^0} \left[N_{\alpha\beta,\alpha}~\delta u^0_{\beta}
+ M_{\alpha\beta,\beta\alpha}~\delta w^0\right]~\mathrm{d}A
- \int_{\Gamma^0} \left[n_\alpha~N_{\alpha\beta}~\delta u^0_{\beta}
+ n_\alpha~M_{\alpha\beta,\beta}~\delta w^0
- n_\beta~M_{\alpha\beta}~\delta w^0_{,\alpha}\right]~\mathrm{d}s \right\}\mathrm{d}t$$

Integration by parts and invoking zero variation at the boundary of the mid-surface gives

$$\delta U = - \int_0^T \left\{\int_{\Omega^0} \left[N_{\alpha\beta,\alpha}~\delta u^0_{\beta}
+ M_{\alpha\beta,\beta\alpha}~\delta w^0\right]~\mathrm{d}A
- \int_{\Gamma^0} \left[n_\alpha~N_{\alpha\beta}~\delta u^0_{\beta}
+ n_\alpha~M_{\alpha\beta,\beta}~\delta w^0
+ n_\beta~M_{\alpha\beta,\alpha}~\delta w^0\right]~\mathrm{d}s \right\}\mathrm{d}t$$

If there is an external distributed force $q(x,t)$ acting normal to the surface of the plate, the virtual external work done is

$$\delta V_{\mathrm{ext}} = \int_0^T \left[\int_{\Omega^0} q(x,t)~\delta w^0~\mathrm{d}A\right]\mathrm{d}t$$

From the principle of virtual work, or more precisely, Hamilton's principle for a deformable body, we have $\delta U = \delta K + \delta V_{\mathrm{ext}}$. Hence the governing balance equations for the plate are

$$\begin{align}
N_{\alpha\beta,\beta} & = J_1~\ddot{u}^0_\alpha \\
M_{\alpha\beta,\alpha\beta} + q(x,t) & = J_1~\ddot{w}^0 - J_3~\ddot{w}^0_{,\alpha\alpha}
\end{align}$$

Solutions of these equations for some special cases can be found in the article on vibrations of plates. The figures below show some vibrational modes of a circular plate.

mode k = 0, p = 1

mode k = 0, p = 2

mode k = 1, p = 2

=== Isotropic plates ===
The governing equations simplify considerably for isotropic and homogeneous plates for which the in-plane deformations can be neglected. In that case we are left with one equation of the following form (in rectangular Cartesian coordinates):

$$D\,\left(\frac{\partial^4 w}{\partial x^4} + 2\frac{\partial^4 w}{\partial x^2\partial y^2} + \frac{\partial^4 w}{\partial y^4}\right) = -q(x, y, t) - 2\rho h\, \frac{\partial^2 w}{\partial t^2} \,.$$

where $D$ is the bending stiffness of the plate. For a uniform plate of thickness $2h$,

$$D := \cfrac{2h^3E}{3(1-\nu^2)} \,.$$

In direct notation

$$D\,\nabla^2\nabla^2 w = -q(x, y, t) - 2\rho h \, \ddot{w} \,.$$

For free vibrations, the governing equation becomes

$$D\,\nabla^2\nabla^2 w = -2\rho h \, \ddot{w} \,.$$

Derivation of dynamic governing equations for isotropic Kirchhoff-Love plates
For an isotropic and homogeneous plate, the stress-strain relations are

$$\begin{bmatrix}\sigma_{11} \\ \sigma_{22} \\ \sigma_{12} \end{bmatrix}
= \cfrac{E}{1-\nu^2}
\begin{bmatrix} 1 & \nu & 0 \\
\nu & 1 & 0 \\
0 & 0 & 1-\nu \end{bmatrix}
\begin{bmatrix}\varepsilon_{11} \\ \varepsilon_{22} \\ \varepsilon_{12} \end{bmatrix} \,.$$

where $\varepsilon_{\alpha\beta}$ are the in-plane strains. The strain-displacement relations for Kirchhoff-Love plates are

$$\varepsilon_{\alpha\beta} = \frac{1}{2}(u_{\alpha,\beta}+u_{\beta,\alpha})
- x_3\,w_{,\alpha\beta} \,.$$

Therefore, the resultant moments corresponding to these stresses are

$$\begin{bmatrix}M_{11} \\ M_{22} \\ M_{12} \end{bmatrix} =
-\cfrac{2h^3E}{3(1-\nu^2)}~\begin{bmatrix} 1 & \nu & 0 \\
\nu & 1 & 0 \\
0 & 0 & 1-\nu \end{bmatrix}
\begin{bmatrix} w_{,11} \\ w_{,22} \\ w_{,12} \end{bmatrix}$$

The governing equation for an isotropic and homogeneous plate of uniform thickness $2h$ in the absence of in-plane displacements is

$$M_{11,11} + 2 M_{12,12} + M_{22,22}
+ q(x,t) = 2\rho h\ddot{w} - \frac{2}{3}\rho h^3\left(\ddot{w}_{,11}+\ddot{w}_{,22} + \ddot{w}_{,33}\right) \,.$$

Differentiation of the expressions for the moment resultants gives us

$$\begin{align}
M_{11,11} & = -\cfrac{2h^3E}{3(1-\nu^2)}\left( w_{,1111} + \nu~w_{,2211}\right) \\
M_{22,22} & = -\cfrac{2h^3E}{3(1-\nu^2)}\left( \nu~w_{,1122} + w_{,2222}\right) \\
M_{12,12} & = -\cfrac{2h^3E}{3(1-\nu^2)}(1-\nu)~w_{,1212}
\end{align}$$

Plugging into the governing equations leads to

$$\begin{align}
-\cfrac{2h^3E}{3(1-\nu^2)}& \left(w_{,1111} + \nu~w_{,2211} + 2(1-\nu)~w_{,1212} +  \nu~w_{,1122} + w_{,2222}\right) =  \\
&  -q(x,t) + 2\rho h\ddot{w} - \frac{2}{3}\rho h^3\left(\ddot{w}_{,11}+\ddot{w}_{,22} + \ddot{w}_{,33}\right) \,.
\end{align}$$

Since the order of differentiation is irrelevant we have $w_{,2211} = w_{,1212} = w_{,1122}$. Hence

$$\begin{align}
-\cfrac{2h^3E}{3(1-\nu^2)}& \left(w_{,1111} + 2w_{,1212} + w_{,2222}\right) =  \\
&  -q(x,t) + 2\rho h\ddot{w} - \frac{2}{3}\rho h^3\left(\ddot{w}_{,11}+\ddot{w}_{,22} + \ddot{w}_{,33}\right) \,.
\end{align}$$

If the flexural stiffness of the plate is defined as

$$D := \cfrac{2h^3E}{3(1-\nu^2)}$$

we have

$$D\left(w_{,1111} + 2w_{,1212} + w_{,2222}\right) =
q(x,t) - 2\rho h\ddot{w} + \frac{2}{3}\rho h^3\left(\ddot{w}_{,11}+\ddot{w}_{,22} + \ddot{w}_{,33}\right) \,.$$

For small deformations, we often neglect the spatial derivatives of the transverse acceleration of the plate and we are left with

$$D\left(w_{,1111} + 2w_{,1212} + w_{,2222}\right) = q(x,t) - 2\rho h\ddot{w} \,.$$

Then, in direct tensor notation, the governing equation of the plate is

$$D\nabla^2\nabla^2 w = q(x,y,t) - 2\rho h\ddot{w} \,.$$

== See also ==
- Bending
- Bending of plates
- Infinitesimal strain theory
- Linear elasticity
- Plate theory
- Stress (mechanics)
- Stress resultants
- Vibration of plates
