= Thomas Hornsby =

British astronomer and mathematician

Thomas Hornsby FRS (1733 in Durham – 11 April 1810 in Oxford) was a British astronomer and mathematician.

== Life ==
Hornsby became a Fellow of Corpus Christi College, Oxford in 1760.

He occupied the Savilian Chair of Astronomy at Oxford University from 1763. In 1782, he became Sedleian Professor of Natural Philosophy.

Hornsby was especially concerned with the observation of the transit of Venus. In 1761, he observed the transit of Venus from Shirburn Castle, in Oxfordshire, the seat of the Earl of Macclesfield. George Parker, 2nd Earl of Macclesfield (ca. 1695–1764), celebrated as an astronomer, had spent most of his time conducting astronomical observations at Shirburn Castle; here he had built an observatory and a chemical laboratory.

On the 1st April 1764 Hornsby observed the partial phases of an annular solar eclipse.

Despite the international efforts made to observe the 1761 transit, poor weather conditions hampered observations. In 1766 Hornsby informed the Royal Society that preparations needed to begin for the 1769 transit, his publication in the Philosophical Transactions of the Royal Society focusing attention on the "cone of visibility" indicating some of the better places to observe the transit.

Hornsby himself viewed the 1769 transit at the Tower of the Five Orders, the entrance to the Bodleian Library in Oxford.

In the periodical Philosophical Transactions, Hornsby published a comparative analysis of 1761 transit (1763); a plan for suitable viewing stations for 1769, including possible locations in the Pacific (1765); a description of organising and reporting observing groups in Oxford (1769); and a comparative analysis of the 1769 transit (1771). Using the solar parallax values obtained from the 1769 transit, he wrote in Philosophical Transitions December 1771 that "the mean distance from the Earth to the Sun (is) 93,726,900 English miles." The radar-based value used today for the astronomical unit is 92,955,000 miles (149,597,000 km). This is only a difference of eight-tenths of one percent. The work was within the bounds of the aphelion and perihelion distances to the sun, ~95 million miles and ~91 million miles respectively. These results have been described as "absolutely remarkable" considering what the astronomers had to work with.

Hornsby was instrumental in the establishment of the Radcliffe Observatory at Oxford in 1772, and was made Radcliffe Observer in the same year. In 1782, he was appointed Sedleian Professor of Natural Philosophy. In 1783, he became Radcliffe Librarian. He was elected a Foreign Honorary Member of the American Academy of Arts and Sciences in 1788.

Hornsby made tens of thousands of astronomical observations. These were not published, however, until 1932, and were donated to Corpus Christi College, Oxford in 1935. They include a determination of the rate of change of the axial inclination of the Earth and the proper motion of Arcturus, both close to the modern values, whose combination of visual magnitude and large proper motion led Hornsby to argue (incorrectly) that "We may, I think, fairly conclude that Arcturus is the nearest Star to our System visible in this Hemisphere".

The crater Hornsby on the Moon is named after him.

N.B. His death announcement in the Kentish Gazette 24 April 1810 quotes his death as "Wednesday (11th Apr. 1810) at the Observatory Oxford, aged 76, the Rev. Thomas Hornsby D.D. & F.R.S. Savilian Professor of Astronomy, Professor of Natural Philosophy, & Librarian of the Radcliffe Library."
The Oxford Dictionary of National Biography gives this information:
"Hornsby, Thomas (1733–1810), astronomer, the son of Thomas Hornsby (bap. 1704, d. 1771), an apothecary and later alderman, and his wife, Thomasine Forster, née Coulson (bap. 1705, d. 1775), was baptized in the parish of St Nicholas, Durham, on 27 August 1733. Hornsby died in Oxford on 11 April 1810, and was buried at St Giles' there on 19 April."

== Sources ==
- Thomas Harriot's manuscripts
- History of transit observing
- Stephen Johnston, "Blast from the Past: Measurement and morals in the early Transits of Venus," Museum of the History of Science, University of Oxford, at http://www.physics.ox.ac.uk/phystat05/Talks/johnston.ppt (accessed July 2006)
- Kentish Gazette 24 April 1810
- Oxford Dictionary of National Biography
- Teets, Donald (December 2003). "Transits of Venus and the Astronomical Unit" (PDF). Mathematics Magazine. 76 (5): 335–348. doi:10.1080/0025570X.2003.11953207. S2CID 54867823.
