= Dorsum Von Cotta =

Wrinkle ridge

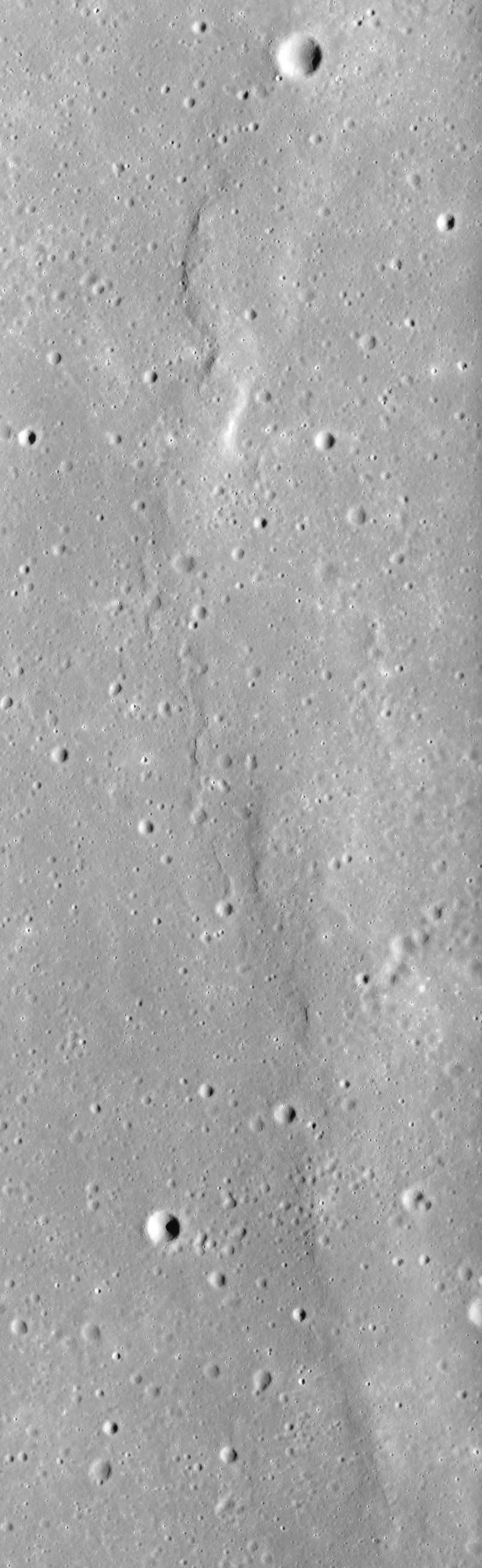
Most of Dorsum Von Cotta, from Apollo 15

Dorsum Von Cotta is a wrinkle ridge at 23.2°N 11.9°E in Mare Serenitatis on the Moon. It is 183 km long and trends south to north at approximately the lunar 12th parallel. It was named after German geologist Bernhard von Cotta in 1976.

To the east of the dorsum is Hornsby crater located and to the west is the collapse feature known as Aratus CA. To the south is Dorsum Buckland.
