= Charles Bertie (professor) =

English clergyman and legal scholar

Rev. Charles Bertie (c.1679 – 15 February 1746/7) was an English clergyman and legal scholar. He was for some time the Sedleian Professor of Natural Philosophy, but this appointment was made for financial reasons, as he had no particular skill in natural philosophy. Bertie was later presented to a series of livings in Devon by his brother-in-law.

The sixth and youngest son of James Bertie, 1st Earl of Abingdon, Bertie matriculated at Christ Church, Oxford on 29 October 1695 and graduated with a BA on 18 December 1699. He entered the Middle Temple on 1 November 1700, but was not called to the bar. On 6 July 1703, he was awarded his MA, and was appointed to a fellowship of All Souls College in that year. He received a BCL on 17 December 1706 and a DCL on 23 October 1711. He married Elizabeth Cary (d. 1759), by whom he had a daughter, Anna (d. 1752) and a son, Charles (d. 1788).

On 26 February 1719/20, he was appointed Sedleian Professor of Natural Philosophy, in succession to James Fayrer. Thomas Hearne noted that this appointment was not due to any skill in the subject, but to allow him to pay his debts to the college; while bursar, he had deputized Barzillai Jones to execute the functions of the office, and was held responsible when Jones absconded with college funds.

Bertie was presented as Rector of Kenn, Devon on 27 August 1726 by his brother-in-law, Sir William Courtenay, 2nd Baronet, and resigned his fellowship in 1727. Courtenay likewise presented him to the livings of Wolborough in 1739 and Honiton on 15 November 1740. Bertie died on 15 February 1746/7 and was buried at Kenn.
