= Augustus Edward Hough Love =

English mathematical physicist (1863–1940)

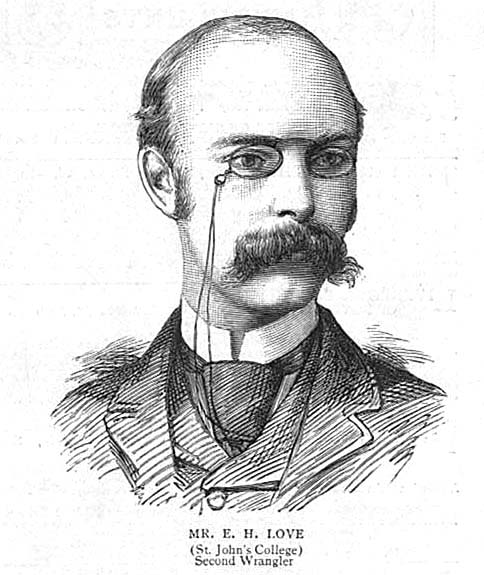
- Born: 17 April 1863; Weston-super-Mare
- Died: 5 June 1940 (aged 77); Oxford, United Kingdom
- Education: St. John's College, Cambridge
- Known for: Theory of elasticity; Lithosphere; Kirchhoff–Love plate theory; Love equivalence principle; Love number; Love wave
- Awards: Royal Medal (1909); Adams Prize (1911); De Morgan Medal (1926); Sylvester Medal (1937)
- Scientific career
- Fields: Theory of elasticity; Geodynamics
- Workplaces: University of Oxford
- Doctoral students: G. H. Hardy

Augustus Edward Hough Love FRS (17 April 1863, Weston-super-Mare – 5 June 1940, Oxford), often known as A. E. H. Love, was an English mathematical physicist famous for research on elasticity. He also studied wave propagation. He won the Adams Prize in 1911 for his work on the structure of the Earth in Some Problems of Geodynamics, in which he developed a mathematical model of surface waves known as Love waves. Love also contributed to the theory of tidal locking and introduced the parameters known as Love numbers, used in problems related to Earth tides, the tidal deformation of the solid Earth due to the gravitational attraction of the Moon and Sun.

== Life and career ==
He was educated at Wolverhampton Grammar School and in 1881 won a scholarship to St John's College, Cambridge, where he was at first undecided whether to study classics or mathematics. In the Mathematical Tripos of 1885 he placed as Second Wrangler, vindicating his choice of mathematics. The next year he was elected Fellow of the college. In 1899 he was appointed Sedleian Professor of Natural Philosophy in the University of Oxford, a position which he retained until his death in 1940. He was also a Fellow of Queen's College.

He authored the two volume classic, A Treatise on the Mathematical Theory of Elasticity.

He was the author of several articles in the 1911 Encyclopædia Britannica, including Elasticity and Infinitesimal Calculus.

His other awards include the Royal Society Royal Medal in 1909 and Sylvester Medal in 1937, and the De Morgan Medal of the London Mathematical Society in 1926. He was secretary to the London Mathematical Society between 1895 and 1910, and president for 1912–1913.

== Works ==
- 1897: Theoretical Mechanics, an introductory treatise on the principles of theoretical dynamics, Cambridge University Press
- 1906: A Treatise on the Mathematical Theory of Elasticity, second edition
- 1911: Some Problems of Geodynamics Cambridge University Press, 1967 republished by Dover Books
- 1944: A Treatise on the Mathematical Theory of Elasticity, fourth edition

== See also ==
- Geodynamics
- Twist (differential geometry)
