= Rynin (crater) =

Lunar crater

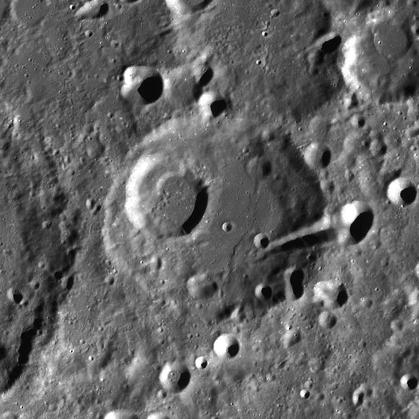
- LRO image
- Coordinates: 46.78°N 103.73°W
- Diameter: 77.88 km (48.39 mi)
- Depth: Unknown
- Colongitude: 104° at sunrise
- Eponym: Nikolaj A. Rynin

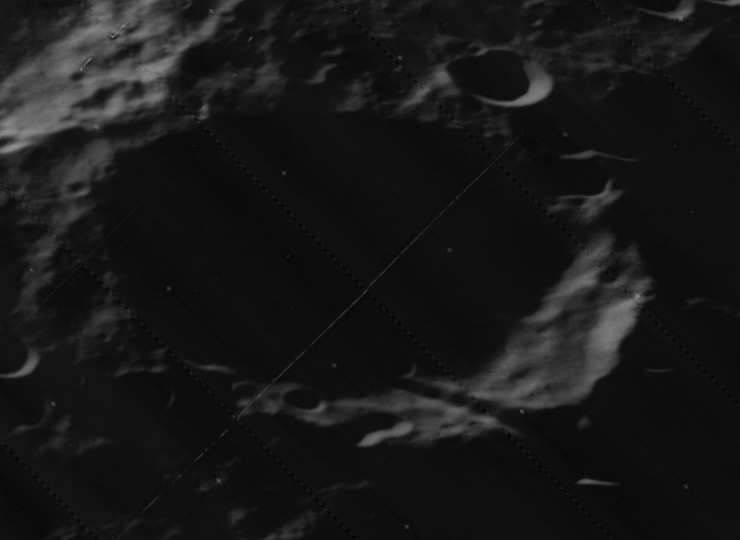
Oblique Lunar Orbiter 5 image, facing west

Rynin is a lunar impact crater that is located just behind the northwestern limb, on the far side of the Moon. It is located just to the east of the larger crater Stefan and to the southwest of Chapman.

This is an older lunar crater with an outer rim worn and rounded due to impact erosion. The edge remains relatively well-defined around most of the perimeter, but several smaller craters overlie it. Along the eastern side is a long, dagger-shaped gash that cuts through the rim and inner wall to reach the interior floor. This gash is connected to a crater formation just outside the eastern edge of Rynin. A shelf of slumped material runs northward along the inner wall.

A smaller crater occupies the western section of Rynin's interior floor, stretching from the base of the inner wall to almost the midpoint of Rynin. Smaller impacts also occur across the otherwise relatively level interior floor, including three along the southern inner wall.

Before formal naming by the IAU in 1970, Rynin was called Crater 103.
