= Sydney Chapman (mathematician) =

British mathematician and geophysicist

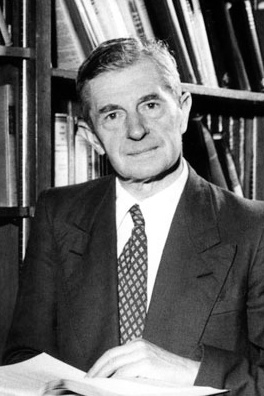
- Sydney Chapman 1888–1970
- Born: 29 January 1888; Eccles, Greater Manchester, England
- Died: 16 June 1970 (aged 82); Boulder, Colorado, U.S.
- Education: University of Manchester; University of Cambridge
- Known for: Chapman cycle Chapman function Chapman–Kolmogorov equation Chapman–Enskog theory
- Awards: Fellow of the Royal Society (1919); Smith's Prize (1913); Adams Prize (1928); Royal Medal (1934); Chree Medal and Prize (1941); De Morgan Medal (1944); William Bowie Medal (1962); Copley Medal (1964); Symons Gold Medal (1965)
- Scientific career
- Workplaces: University of Manchester; University of Cambridge; Imperial College London; University of Oxford; The Queen's College, Oxford; Royal Observatory, Greenwich, University of Colorado
- Academic advisors: G. H. Hardy
- Doctoral students: Syun-Ichi Akasofu; Franz Kahn; George Frederick James Temple

Sydney Chapman FRS (29 January 1888 – 16 June 1970) was a British mathematician and geophysicist. His work on the kinetic theory of gases, solar-terrestrial physics, and the Earth's ozone layer has inspired a broad range of research over many decades.

== Education and early life ==
Chapman was born in Eccles, near Salford in England and began his advanced studies at a technical institute, now the University of Salford, in 1902. In 1904 at age 16, Chapman entered the University of Manchester. He competed for a scholarship to the university offered by his home county, and was the last student selected. Chapman later reflected, "I sometimes wonder what would have happened if I'd hit one place lower." He initially studied engineering in the department headed by Osborne Reynolds. Chapman was taught mathematics by Horace Lamb, the Beyer professor of mathematics, and J. E. Littlewood, who came from Cambridge in Chapman's final year at Manchester. Although he graduated with an engineering degree, Chapman had become so enthusiastic for mathematics that he stayed for one further year to take a mathematics degree. Following Lamb's suggestion, Chapman applied for a scholarship to Trinity College, Cambridge. He was at first awarded only a partial scholarship as a sizar (meaning that he obtained financial support by acting as a servant to other students), but from his second year onwards he received a full scholarship. He graduated as a wrangler in 1910. He began his research in pure mathematics under G. H. Hardy, but later that year was asked by Sir Frank Dyson to be his chief assistant at the Royal Greenwich Observatory.

== Career and research ==
From 1914 to 1919, Chapman returned to Cambridge as a lecturer in mathematics and a fellow of Trinity. He held the Beyer Chair of Applied Mathematics at Manchester from 1919 to 1924, the same position as had been held by Lamb. On his return to Manchester he was elected to the membership of Manchester Literary and Philosophical Society on 4 November 1919 giving his details as Professor SYDNEY CHAPMAN, M.A., D.Sc., F.R.S., Professor of Mathematics and Natural Philosophy in the Victoria University of Manchester,. He subsequently moved to Imperial College London. During the Second World War he was Deputy Scientific Advisor to the Army Council.

In 1946, Chapman was elected to the Sedleian Chair of Natural Philosophy at Oxford, and was appointed fellow of The Queen's College, Oxford. In 1953, on his retirement from Oxford, Chapman took research and teaching opportunities all over the world, including at the University of Alaska and the University of Colorado, but also as far afield as Istanbul, Cairo, Prague, and Tokyo. As the Advisory Scientific Director of the University of Alaska Geophysical Institute from 1951 to 1970, he spent three months of the year in Alaska, usually during winter for research into auroras. Much of the remainder of the year he spent at the High Altitude Observatory in Boulder, Colorado.

Chapman's most noted mathematical accomplishments were in the field of stochastic processes (random processes), especially Markov processes. In his study of Markovian stochastic processes and their generalizations, Chapman and the Russian Andrey Kolmogorov independently developed the pivotal set of equations in the field, the Chapman–Kolmogorov equations. Chapman is credited with working out, in 1930, the photochemical mechanisms that give rise to the ozone layer.

Chapman is recognised as one of the pioneers of solar-terrestrial physics. This interest stemmed from his early work on the kinetic theory of gases. Chapman studied magnetic storms and aurorae, developing theories to explain their relation to the interaction of the Earth's magnetic field with the solar wind. He disputed and ridiculed the work of Kristian Birkeland and Hannes Alfvén, later adopting Birkeland's theories as his own. Chapman and his first graduate student, V. C. A. Ferraro, predicted the presence of the magnetosphere in the early 1930s. They also predicted characteristics of the magnetosphere that were confirmed 30 years later by the Explorer 12 satellite.

In 1940, Chapman and a German colleague Julius Bartels published a book in two volumes on geomagnetism, which was to become the standard text book for the next two decades. In 1946 Chapman coined the term: Aeronomy, which is used today to describe the scientific field of high-altitude research into atmosphere/space interaction.

From 1951 to 1954, Chapman was president of the International Union of Geodesy and Geophysics (IUGG).

Chapman was President of the Special Committee for the International Geophysical Year (IGY). The idea of the IGY stemmed from a discussion in 1950 between Chapman and scientists including James Van Allen. The IGY was held in 1957–58, and resulted in great progress in fields including Earth and space sciences, as well as leading to the first satellite launches.

=== Honours and awards ===
Chapman was bestowed many honours over his career, including Smith's Prize in 1913, election as a Fellow of the Royal Society in 1919, Invited Speaker of the ICM in 1924, Royal Society Bakerian lecturer in 1931, Royal Society Royal Medal in 1934, London Mathematical Society De Morgan Medal in 1944. In 1949, he was awarded the Gold Medal of the Royal Astronomical Society and was elected as a Fellow of the Royal Society of Edinburgh in 1953. In 1964, he was awarded the Copley Medal of the Royal Society and in 1965 the Symons Gold Medal of the Royal Meteorological Society. He was elected to the National Academies of Science of the United States, Norway, Sweden and Finland. He served as president of the London Mathematical Society during 1929–1931 and the Royal Meteorological Society 1932–1933.

The lunar Crater Chapman is named in his honour, as is the Sydney Chapman Building on the campus of the University of Alaska Fairbanks. This building served as the first permanent home of the University of Alaska Geophysical Institute, and it now contains the Department of Computer Science and the Department of Mathematics and Statistics. The American Geophysical Union organises "Chapman Conferences," which are small, topical meetings intended to foster innovative research in key areas. The Royal Astronomical Society founded the Chapman Medal in his memory.

== Personal life ==
In 1970, Chapman died in Boulder, Colorado, at the age of 82. His wife died in 1967.

Preceded by Horace Lamb	Beyer Chair of Applied Mathematics at University of Manchester; 1924–1928	Succeeded by Edward Arthur Milne
