= Nikolai Rynin =

Russian civil engineer (1887–1942)

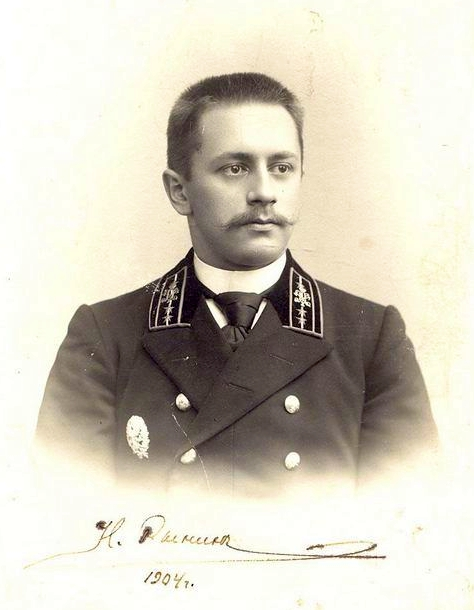
- Born: 23 December 1887
- Died: 23 July 1942 (aged 54)
- Education: Emperor Alexander Institute of Railway Engineers
- Engineering career
- Discipline: Civil engineering

Nikolai Alekseevich Rynin (Russian: Николай Алексеевич Рынин; 23 December 1887 – 28 July 1942) was a Russian civil engineer, teacher, aerospace researcher, author, historian, and promoter of space travel.

== Career ==
Rynin began his career in civil engineering, working in the railway industry. However, in 1906 he developed an interest in aircraft and manned flight. During his career he performed research in aeronautics, became a balloonist and aircraft pilot, taught aerospace topics as a professor in Leningrad, and wrote various books and articles on airplanes and space travel.

In the April 1918 issue of the Byloye magazine, Rynin published Nikolai Kibalchich's description of a manned, rocket-propelled ship. It had been detailed in Kibalchich's final letter, and had languished in police archives until Rynin heard rumors of the design and fished it out.

Between 1928 and 1932 he published a nine-volume encyclopedia of space travel called the Mezhplanetnye Soobschniya ("Interplanetary Communications"). He is known to have corresponded with peers in the West, including Robert H. Goddard in 1926, concerning Russian rocketry activities.

Rynin died from a combination of starvation and illness during the German siege of Leningrad, as did fellow spaceflight promoter Yakov Perelman.

The crater Rynin on the Moon is named after him.

== Interplanetary Communications ==
Rynin's encyclopedia contains the following nine volumes:

- Dreams, Legends, and Early Fantasies
- Spacecraft in Science Fiction
- Radiant Energy: Science Fiction and Scientific Projects
- Rockets
- Theory of rocket propulsion
- Superaviation and superartillery
- K. E. Tsiolkoviskii; life, writings, and rockets
- Theory of space flight
- Astronavigation; theory, annals, bibliography, index.

They are available in English from NASA as follows:

- Rynin, N.A. Interplanetary Flight and Communication. Washington, D.C.: NASA and NSF, 1970–71. (NASA TT F-640, TT F-642 through TT F-648) (Holdings: Vol. 1, Nos. 1 and 3; Vol. II, Nos. 4 and 6, Vol. III, Nos. 7, 8 and 9).
