= Bernhard von Cotta =

German geologist (1808–1879)

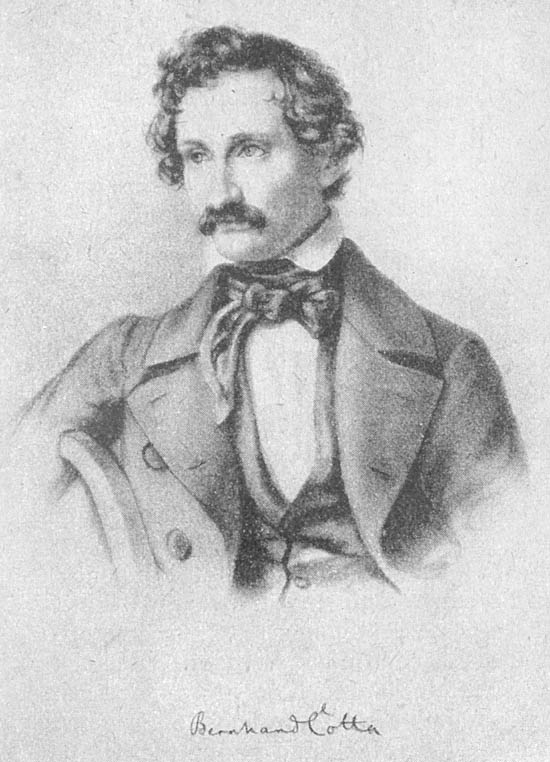
Bernhard von Cotta in 1847 (lithograph)

Carl Bernhard von Cotta, known as Bernhard von Cotta (24 October 1808 – 14 September 1879), was a German geologist.

== Life ==
He was born in a forester's lodge at Kleine Zillbach, Meiningen, near Eisenach, the son of Heinrich von Cotta, founder of the Tharandt Forestry Academy near Dresden. He was educated first at the Tharnadt Academcy, then at the Bergakademie Freiberg and the University of Heidelberg. Botany at first attracted him and he was one of the earliest to use the microscope in determining the structure of fossil plants. Later on he gave his attention to geology, to the study of ore-deposits, of rocks and metamorphism. He studied deposits of minerals in the Austrian Alps, Hungary, and Romania. He also examined soils and studied their effects on the geography and history of Germany.

From 1842 to 1874 he held the professorship of geology in the Bergakademie and was regarded as an excellent teacher. He published many important works on geology, including Rocks Classified and Described: A Treatise on Lithology (translated by Philip Henry Lawrence, 1866), one of the first comprehensive works on the subject issued in the English language, which gave great impetus to the study of rocks in Britain.

Cotta supported democratic and liberal ideas. In 1848 he was a candidate for the German National Assembly in Frankfurt am Main, as well as the president of the Patriotic Club in Freiberg. He also contributed to popularizing Alexander von Humboldt's Kosmos work.

He also worked with Professor Carl Friedrich Naumann to publish geological maps of the region of Saxony between 1836 and 1847. He was an early supporter of Darwinism.

He died in Freiberg, Saxony.

His daughter, Alice von Cotta, born in 1842, worked at Bedford College, London, and later as a school principal at the women's school Victoria-Lyceum in Berlin.

== Commemorations ==
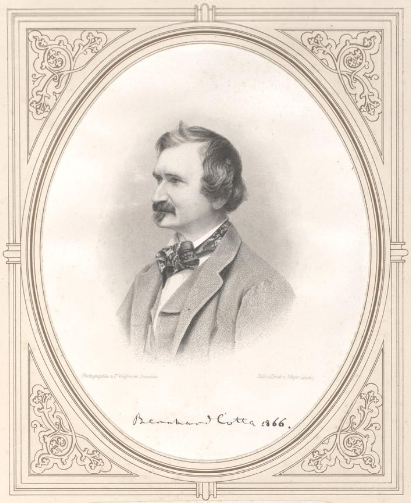
Bernhard von Cotta, in 1866

- Bernhard-von-Cotta-Straße in Freiberg, the location of the present Bergakadamie Freiberg, Inst. of Geology, is named after him.
- The Dorsum Von Cotta, a wrinkle ridge on the Moon, is named after him.

== Publications ==
- Die Dendrolithen, 1832
- Geognostische Karte von Sachsen, 1832–1845
- Geognostische Wanderungen, Bd. 1–2, 1836–1838
- Anleitung zum Studium der Geologie und Geognosie, 1839
- Geognostische Karte von Thüringen, 1843–1848
- Gangstudien, Bd. 1–4, 1850–1862
- Briefe über Humboldt's Kosmos, 1848–1860
- Gesteinslehre, Bd. 1–2, 1855, 1866 (englisch)
- Lehre von den Flözformationen, 1856
- Deutschlands Boden, sein geologischer Bau und dessen Einwirkung auf das Leben des Menschen, Bd. 1–2, 1854 u. 1858
- Lehre von den Erzlagerstätten, Bd.1–2, 1859–1861, 1870 (englisch)
- Katechismus der Geologie, 1861
- Geologie der Gegenwart, 1865
- Der Altai, sein geologischer Bau und seine Erzlagerstätten, 1871
- Geologische Bilder, 1876
