= Hornsby (crater) =

Crater on the Moon

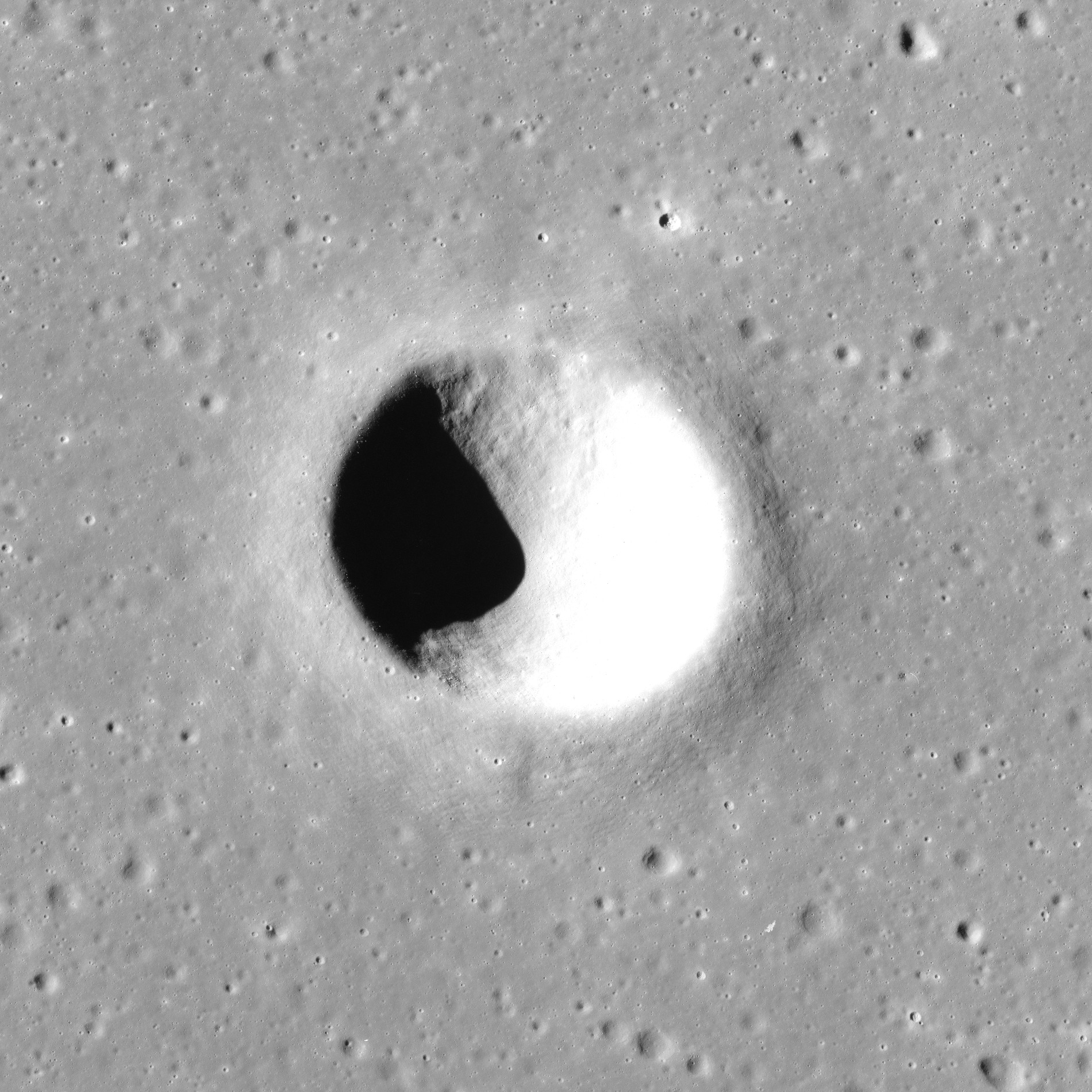
- Apollo 15 image
- Coordinates: 23.8°N 12.5°E
- Diameter: 3 km
- Depth: 0.4 km
- Colongitude: 348° at sunrise
- Eponym: Thomas Hornsby

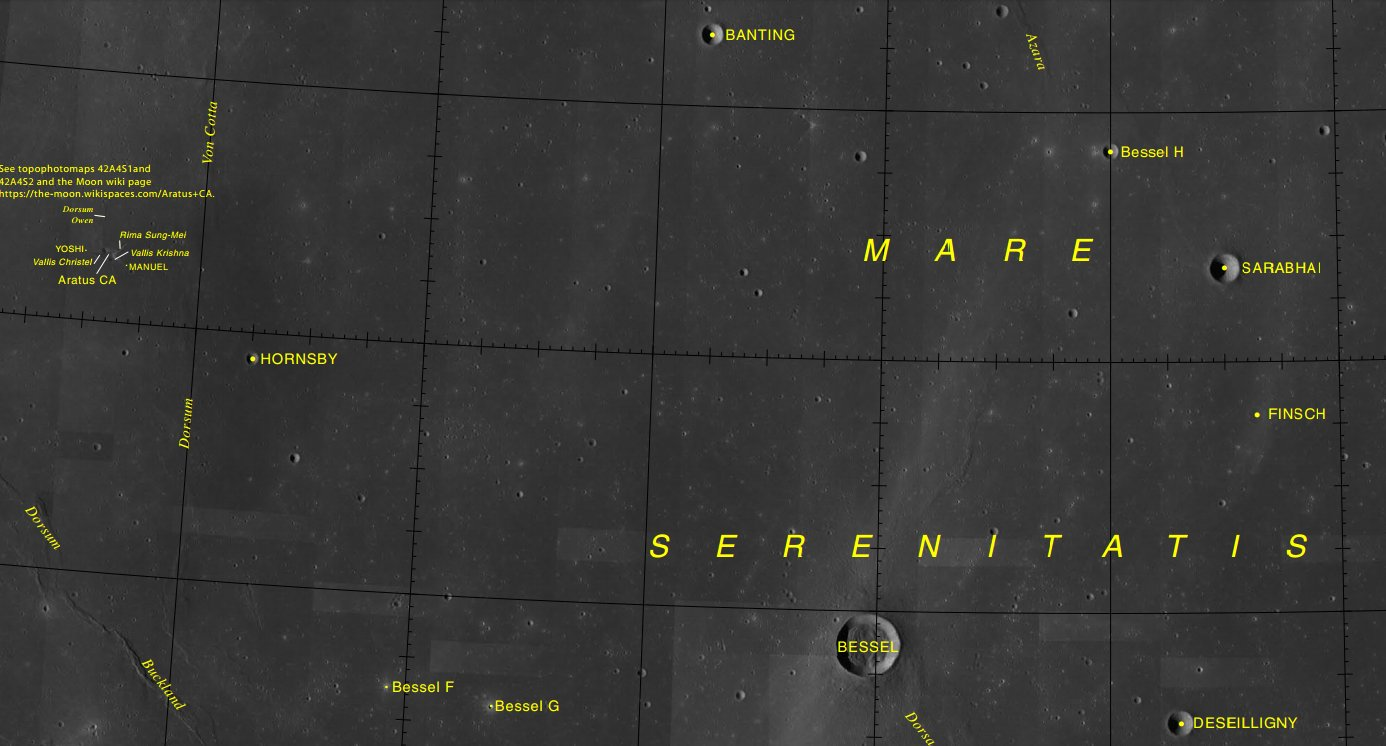
Regional map showing location of Hornsby in Mare Serenitatis

Hornsby is a tiny lunar impact crater in the western part of the Mare Serenitatis, a lunar mare in the northeast quadrant of the Moon's near side. It was named after British astronomer Thomas Hornsby. It is a solitary formation that is located at least 100 kilometers (62 mi) from any significant craters, although the curiously shaped depression Aratus CA lies about 50 km (31 mi) to the west-northwest. To the north-northwest is Linné, a feature notable for its skirt of high-albedo material. To the west of Hornsby is the wrinkle ridge Dorsum Von Cotta.
