= Chapman (crater) =

Crater on the Moon

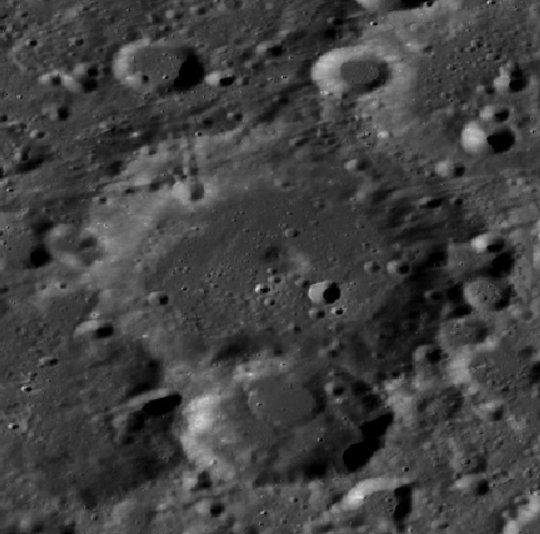
- LRO image
- Coordinates: 50.09°N 100.47°W
- Diameter: 76.83 km (47.74 mi)
- Depth: Unknown
- Colongitude: 101° at sunrise
- Formation: Pre-Nectarian
- Eponym: Sydney Chapman

Chapman is a lunar impact crater that lies just beyond the northwest rim of the Moon, on the far side as seen from the Earth. It lies to the northeast of the crater Rynin, and southward of the large walled plain named Poczobutt.

This is an old, eroded crater formation that dates to the Pre-Nectarian period on the lunar geologic timescale. Its features that have been softened and worn by impacts until now it just forms a bowl-shaped depression in the surface. The rim is circular in form along most of its perimeter, but has been broken through along the southern edge by Chapman W. There is an unnamed crater-like depression in the surface attached to the southwest rim, and here the edge is low and more narrow than the remaining inner wall.

Several small craters lie along the outer rim and inner wall, with an attached pair forming a cleft in the western rim. There is a slender cleft in the wall along the northwest inner wall that runs from the western rim to the north. The interior floor of the crater is relatively flat and featureless in comparison to the rugged terrain that surrounds the crater, although it is pock-marked by several small impacts in the southeast quadrant.

This crater is named after British geophysicist and mathematician Sydney Chapman (1888–1970). Its designation was formally adopted by the International Astronomical Union in 1970.

== Satellite craters ==
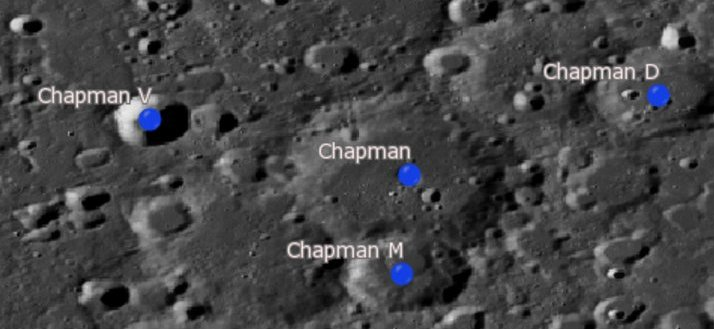
Satellite features of Chapman

By convention these features are identified on lunar maps by placing the letter on the side of the crater midpoint that is closest to Chapman.

Chapman	Latitude	Longitude	Diameter
D	51.4° N	96.8° W	39 km
M	49.0° N	100.7° W	38 km
V	51.0° N	103.8° W	21 km
