= George Leigh Cooke =

George Leigh Cooke (baptised 1779 – 1853) was a mathematician and priest who held the position of Sedleian Professor of Natural Philosophy at the University of Oxford for over 40 years.

== Life ==
George Leigh Cooke was the son of a Samuel Cooke, from Bookham in Surrey. He was baptised on 12 September 1779. Cooke matriculated at the University of Oxford as a member of Balliol College on 26 January 1797, at the age of 17, and became a scholar of Corpus Christi College in the same year. He was elected to a fellowship of Corpus Christi in 1800, the year in which he obtained his Bachelor of Arts degree, and retained this position until 1815, when he resigned in order to marry Ann, the daughter of William Hay of London. He took his Master of Arts degree in 1804 and his Bachelor of Divinity degree in 1812. He was appointed Sedleian Professor of Natural Philosophy in 1810, retaining this post until 1853. He was also Keeper of the Archives of the university between 1818 and 1826. An ordained Anglican priest, in 1820 he was appointed vicar of Wick Rissington in Gloucestershire, and also vicar of Cubbington and of Hunningham (both in Warwickshire). He was regarded as a sociable individual, who was one of the main figures of the Literary Dining Club for Oxford academics.

He died on 29 March 1853 at Cubbington., leaving a widow and several children, including George Theophilus Cooke.
