= Love number =

Parameters describing a planet's rigidity

The Love numbers (h, k, and l) are dimensionless parameters that measure the rigidity of a planetary body or other gravitating object, and the susceptibility of its shape to change in response to an external tidal potential.

In 1909, Augustus Edward Hough Love introduced the values h and k which characterize the overall elastic response of the Earth to the tides—Earth tides or body tides. Later, in 1912, Toshi Shida added a third Love number, l, which was needed to obtain a complete overall description of the solid Earth's response to the tides.

== Definitions ==
The Love number h is defined as the ratio of the body tide to the height of the static equilibrium tide; also defined as the vertical (radial) displacement or variation of the planet's elastic properties. In terms of the tide generating potential $V(\theta, \phi )/g$, the displacement is $h V(\theta, \phi)/g$ where $\theta$ is latitude, $\phi$ is east longitude and $g$ is acceleration due to gravity. For a hypothetical solid Earth $h = 0$. For a liquid Earth, one would expect $h = 1$. However, the deformation of the sphere causes the potential field to change, and thereby deform the sphere even more. The theoretical maximum is $h = 2.5$. For the real Earth, $h$ lies between 0 and 1.

The Love number k is defined as the cubical dilation or the ratio of the additional potential (self-reactive force) produced by the deformation of the deforming potential. It can be represented as $k V(\theta, \phi)/g$, where $k = 0$ for a rigid body.

The Love number l represents the ratio of the horizontal (transverse) displacement of an element of mass of the planet's crust to that of the corresponding static ocean tide. In potential notation the transverse displacement is $l \nabla (V(\theta, \phi))/g$, where $\nabla$ is the horizontal gradient operator. As with h and k, $l = 0$ for a rigid body.

== Values ==
According to Cartwright, "An elastic solid spheroid will yield to an external tide potential $U_2$ of spherical harmonic degree 2 by a surface tide $h_2U_2/g$ and the self-attraction of this tide will increase the external potential by $k_2U_2$." The magnitudes of the Love numbers depend on the rigidity and mass distribution of the spheroid. Love numbers $h_n$, $k_n$, and $l_n$ can also be calculated for higher orders of spherical harmonics.

For elastic Earth the Love numbers lie in the range: $0.616 \leq h_2 \leq 0.624$, $0.304 \leq k_2 \leq 0.312$ and $0.084 \leq l_2 \leq 0.088$.

For Earth's tides one can calculate the tilt factor as $1 + k - h$ and the gravimetric factor as $1 + h - (3/2)k$, where subscript two is assumed.

Neutron stars are thought to have high rigidity in the crust, and thus a low Love number: $0.05 \leq k_2 \leq 0.17$. In $D$ spacetime dimensions, Schwarzschild black holes have vanishing static tidal Love numbers $k_\ell = 0$ at multipoles $\ell=D-3$. Measuring the Love numbers of compact objects in binary mergers is a key goal of gravitational-wave astronomy, and requires relativistic calculations for neutron stars.
