= List of German physicists =

This is a list of German physicists.

== A ==
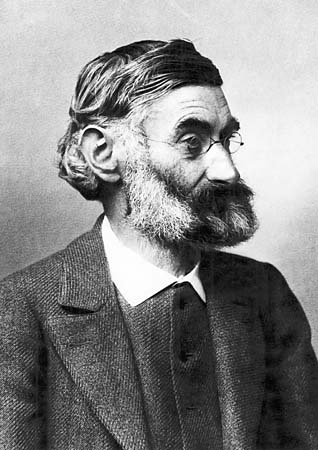
Ernst Abbe

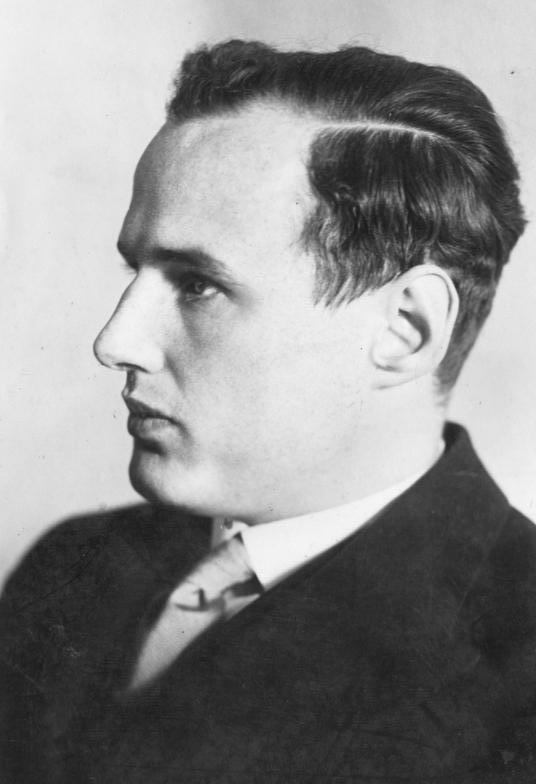
Manfred von Ardenne

- Ernst Abbe
- Max Abraham
- Gerhard Abstreiter
- Michael Adelbulner
- Martin Aeschlimann
- Georg von Arco
- Manfred von Ardenne
- Peter Armbruster
- Leo Arons
- Markus Aspelmeyer
- Felix Auerbach
- Bruno Augenstein

== B ==
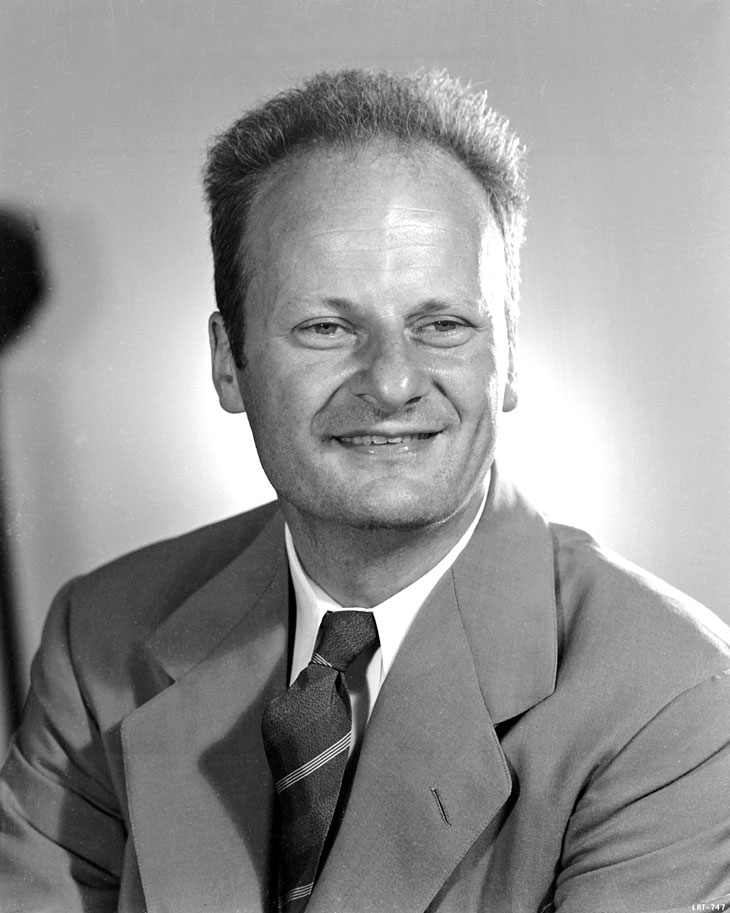
Hans Bethe

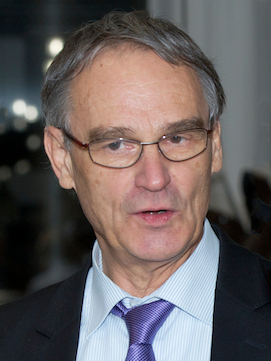
Gerd Binnig

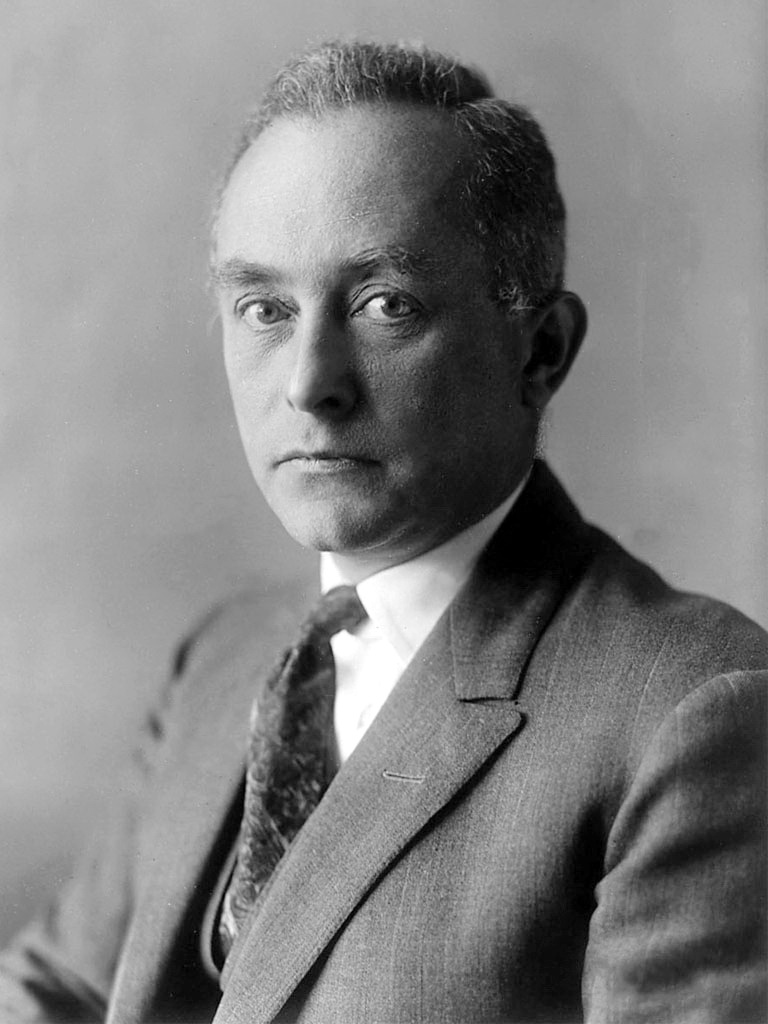
Max Born

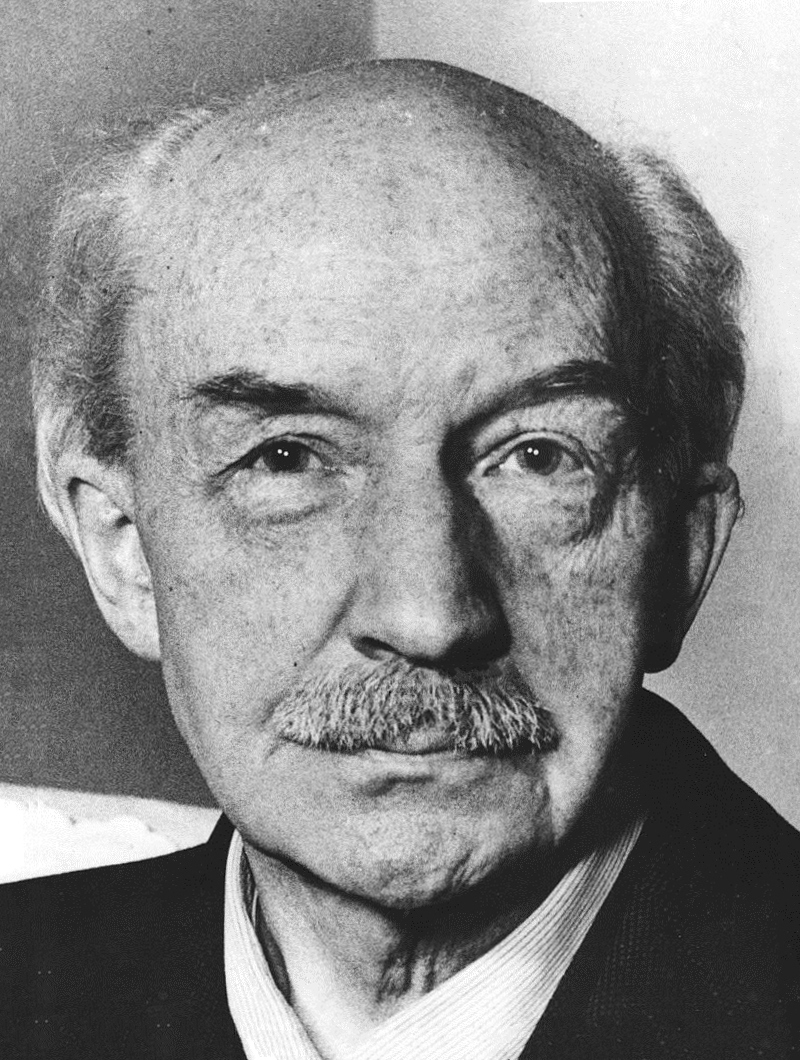
Walther Bothe

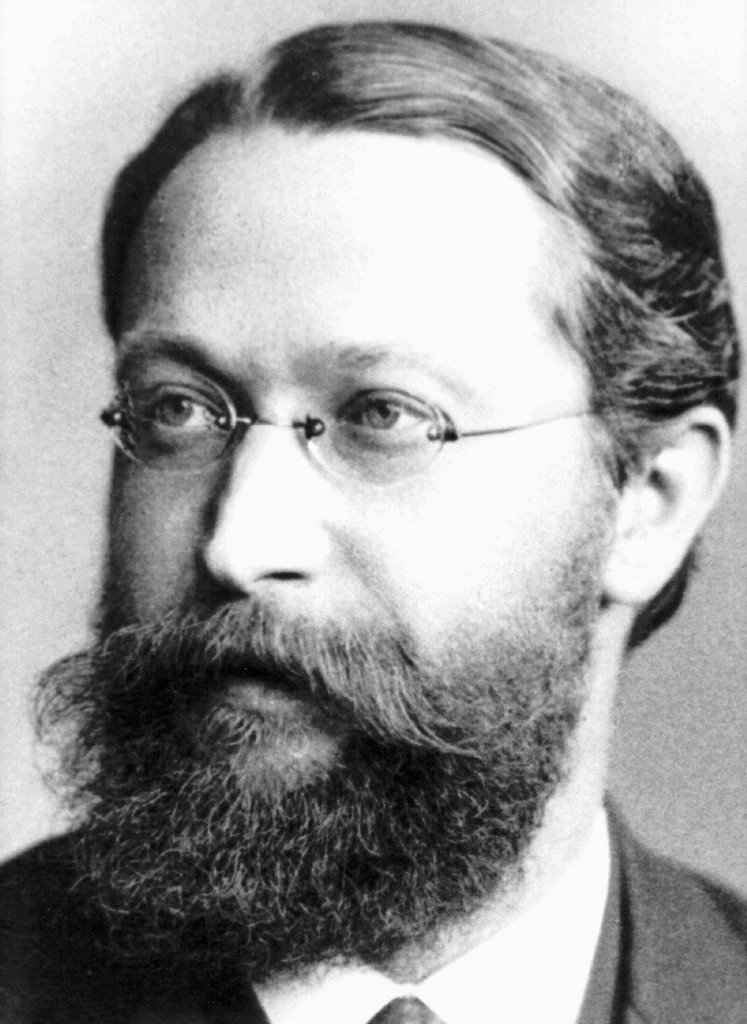
Karl Ferdinand Braun

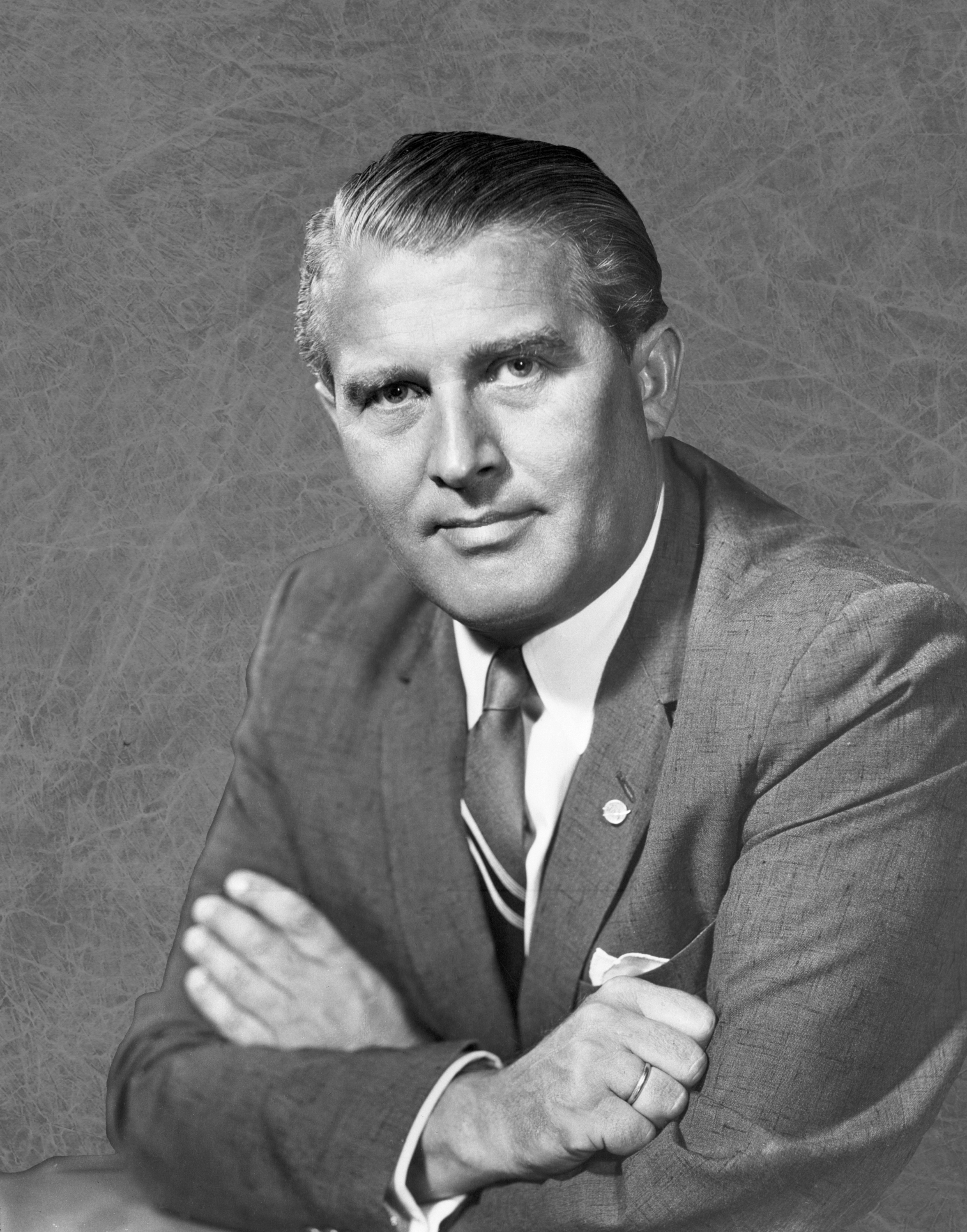
Wernher von Braun

- Ernst Emil Alexander Back
- Karl Baedeker
- Erich Bagge
- Marc Baldus
- Valentine Bargmann
- Heinrich Barkhausen
- Henry H. Barschall
- Heinz Barwich
- Ernst G. Bauer
- Elisabeth Bauser
- Karl Bechert
- Friedrich Beck
- Guido Beck
- Richard Becker
- Karl Heinz Beckurts
- Georg Bednorz
- August Beer
- Wilhelm von Beetz
- Martin Beneke
- Johann Benzenberg
- Berend Wilhelm Feddersen
- Arnold Berliner
- Arthur Berson
- Adolf Bestelmeyer
- Hans Bethe
- Sigfried Bethke
- Albert Betz
- Hans-Dieter Betz
- Paul Alfred Biefeld
- Ikaros Bigi
- Josef Bille
- Heinz Billing
- Gerd Binnig
- Marcus Birkenkrahe
- Paul Richard Heinrich Blasius
- Klaus Blaum
- Immanuel Bloch
- Detlef Blöcher
- Werner H. Bloss
- Eberhard Bodenschatz
- Bodo von Borries
- Martin Bojowald
- Friedrich Bopp
- Hans-Jürgen Borchers
- Max Born
- Manfred Börner
- Richard Börnstein
- Gerhard Borrmann
- Emil Bose
- Georg Matthias Bose
- Walther Bothe
- Heinrich Wilhelm Brandes
- Ernst Helmut Brandt
- Karl Ferdinand Braun
- Wernher von Braun
- Werner Braunbeck
- Carsten Bresch
- Nikolas Breuckmann
- Hans Breuer
- Dirk Brockmann
- Eugen Brodhun
- Ernst Brüche
- Hermann Brück
- Alfred Bucherer
- Detlev Buchholz
- Bernd Büchner
- Alfons Bühl
- Heinrich Bürger
- Hans Busch
- Gerd Buschhorn

== C ==
- Philipp Carl
- Lorenz S. Cederbaum
- Ernst Chladni
- Elwin Bruno Christoffel
- Rudolf Clausius
- Emil Cohn
- Theodor des Coudres
- Christoph Cremer
- Erika Cremer
- Siegfried Czapski

== D ==
Konrad Dannenberg

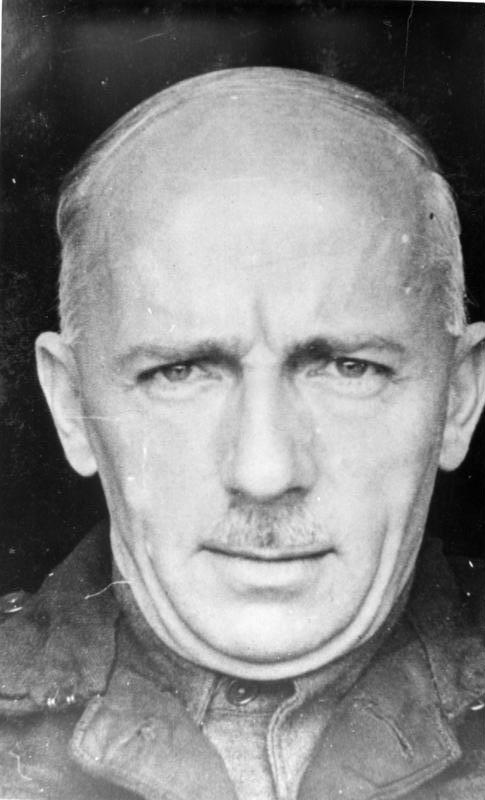
Walter Dornberger

- Konrad Dannenberg
- Kurt H. Debus
- Max Delbrück
- Wolfgang Demtröder
- Guido Dessauer
- Kurt Diebner
- Gerhard Heinrich Dieke
- Walter Dieminger
- Hansjoerg Dittus
- Günther Dollinger
- Klara Döpel
- Robert Döpel
- Werner Döring
- Friedrich Ernst Dorn
- Walter Dornberger
- Heinrich Wilhelm Dove
- Jörg Dräger
- Olaf Dreyer
- Paul Drude
- Dirk Dubbers
- Hans-Peter Dürr

== E ==
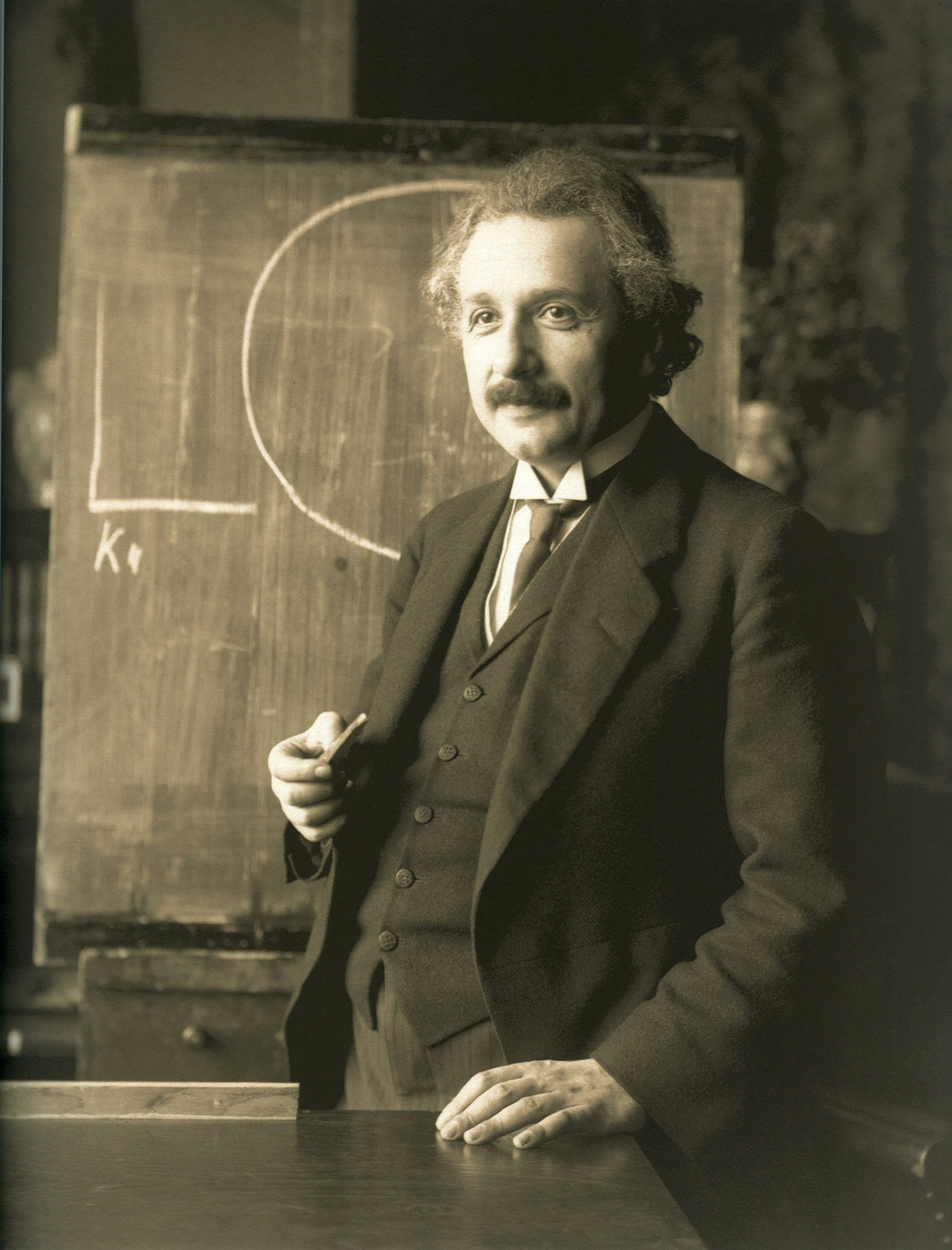
Albert Einstein

- Gustav Eberhard
- Hermann Ebert
- Ernst R. G. Eckert
- Eduard Riecke
- Jürgen Ehlers
- Geoffrey G. Eichholz
- Albert Einstein
- Wolfgang Eisenmenger
- Jens Eisert
- Walter M. Elsasser
- Julius Elster
- Berthold-Georg Englert
- Georg Adolf Erman
- Paul Erman
- Gerhard Ertl
- Abraham Esau
- Tilman Esslinger
- Andreas von Ettingshausen
- Arnold Eucken
- Hans Heinrich Euler
- Paul Peter Ewald

== F ==
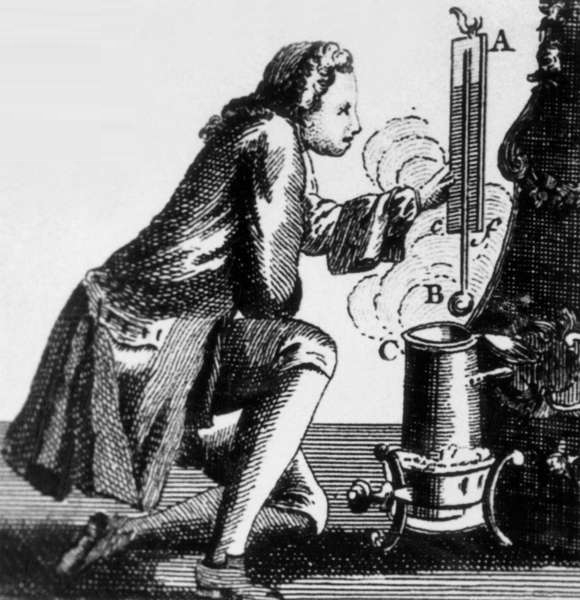
Daniel Gabriel Fahrenheit

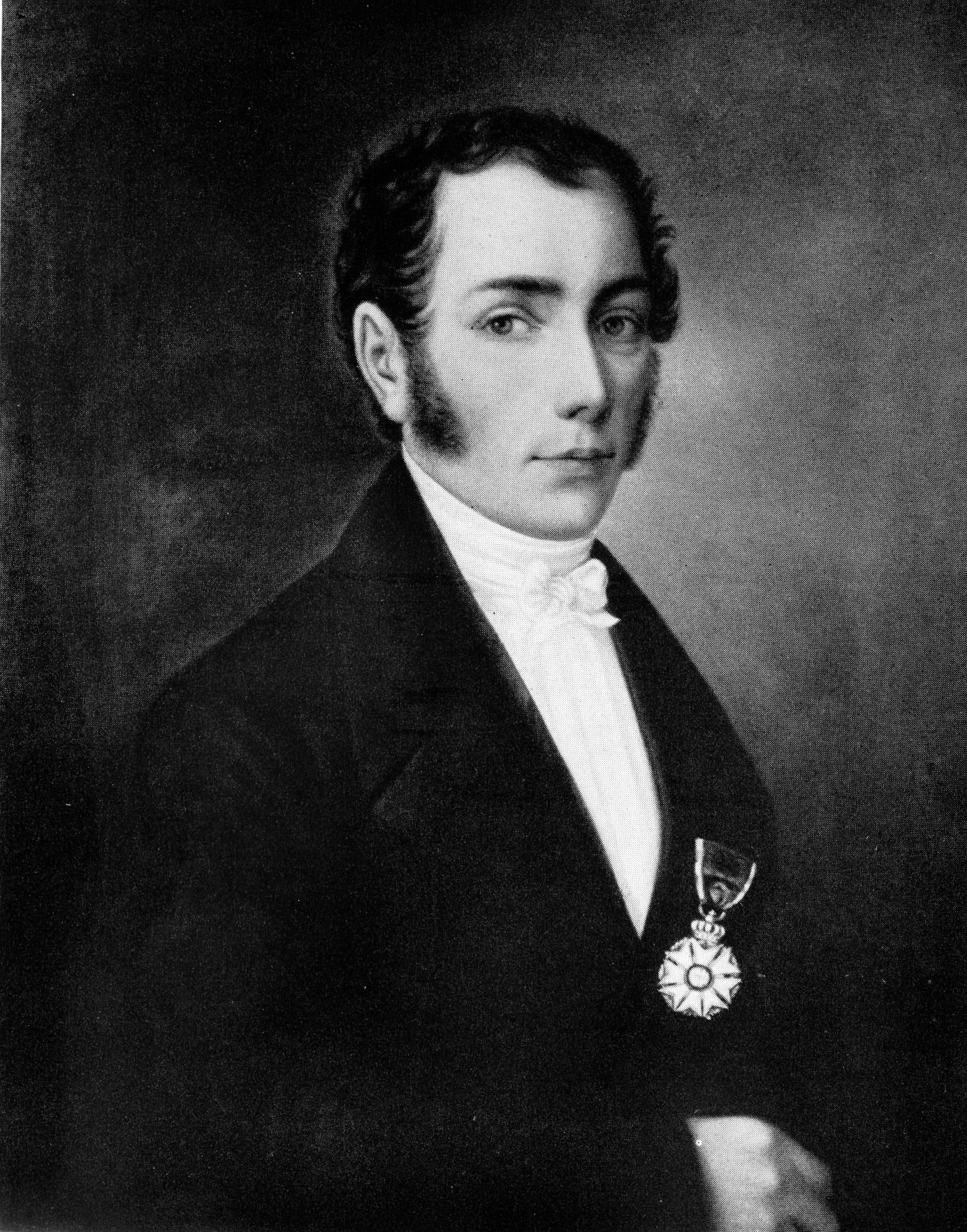
Joseph von Fraunhofer

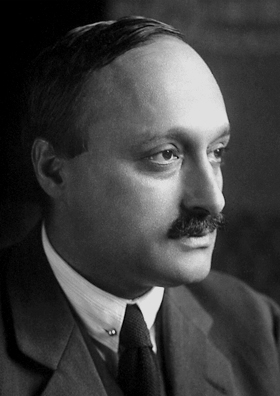
James Franck

- Daniel Gabriel Fahrenheit
- Heino Falcke
- Hans Falkenhagen
- Lutz Feld
- Claudia Felser
- Klaus Fesser
- Wolfgang Fink
- Peter Finke
- Wolfgang Finkelnburg
- Erich Fischer
- Johannes Fischer
- Elisabeth Fischer-Friedrich
- Arnold Flammersfeld
- Rudolf Fleischmann
- Siegfried Flügge
- Albrecht Fölsing
- Theodor Förster
- Jens Frahm
- James Franck
- Moritz Ludwig Frankenheim
- Rudolph Franz
- Walter Franz
- Joseph von Fraunhofer
- Theodoric of Freiberg
- Benedict Friedlaender
- Harald Friedrich
- Harald Fritzsch
- Hellmut Fritzsche
- Klaus Fuchs
- Erwin Fues
- Peter Fulde

== G ==
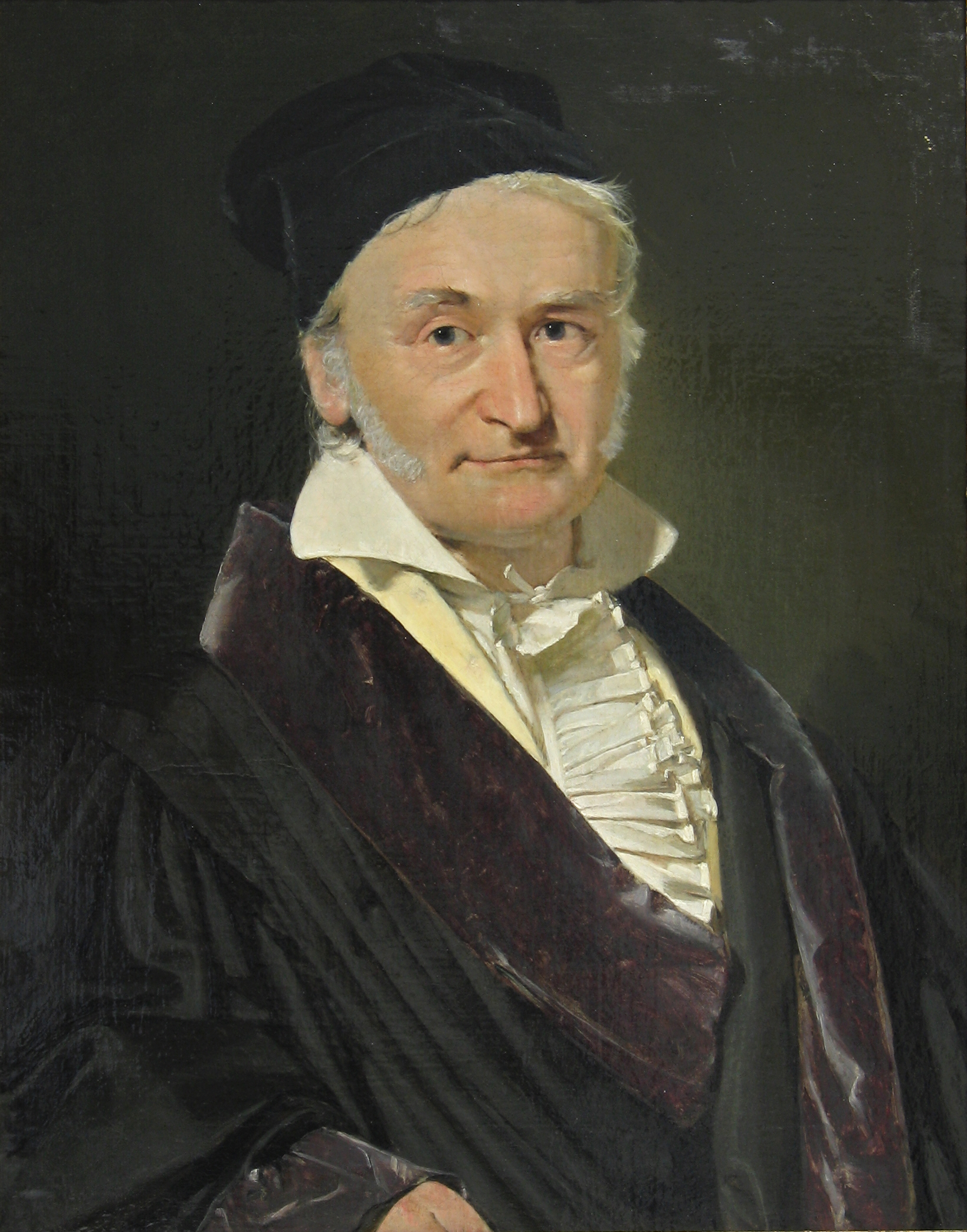
Carl Friedrich Gauss

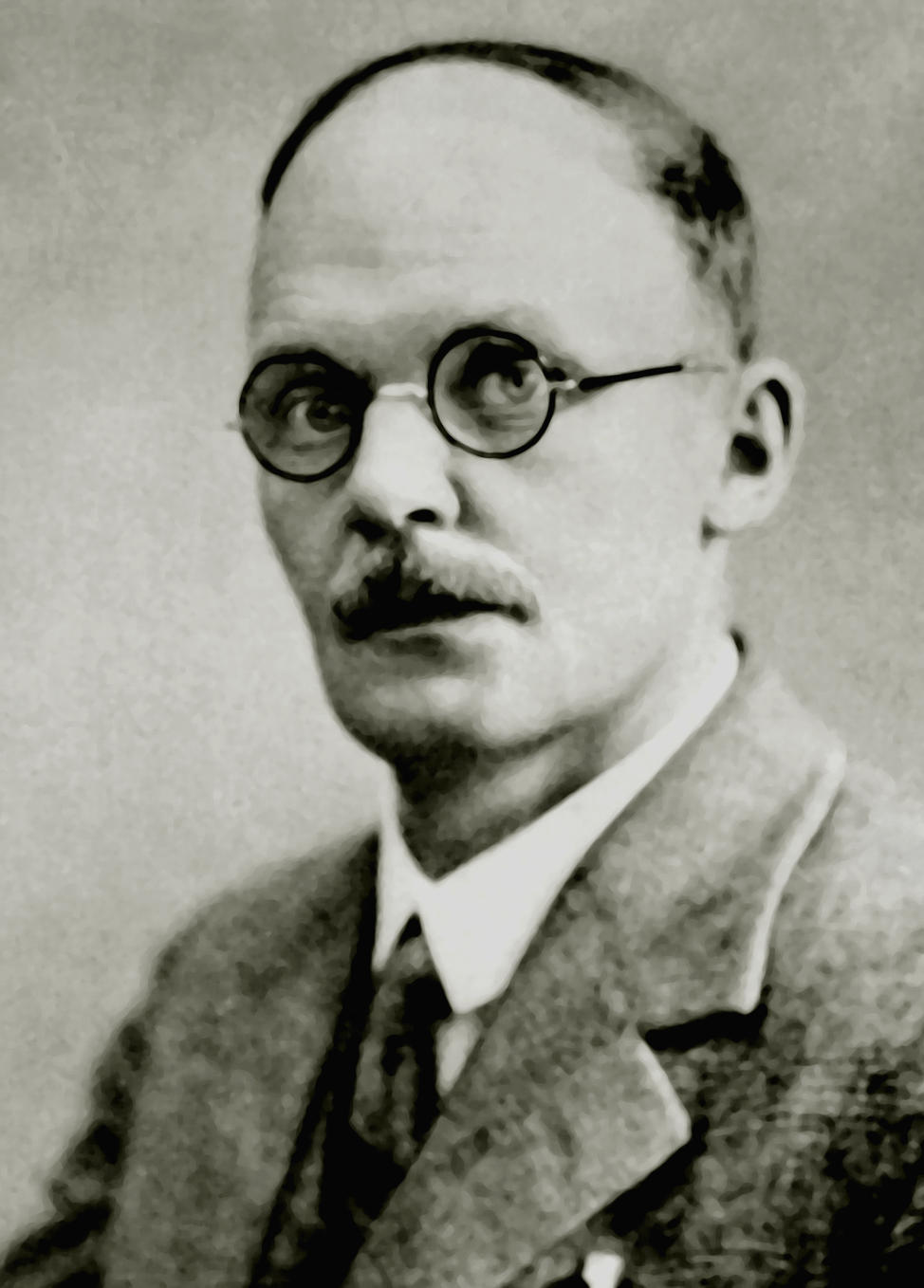
Hans Geiger

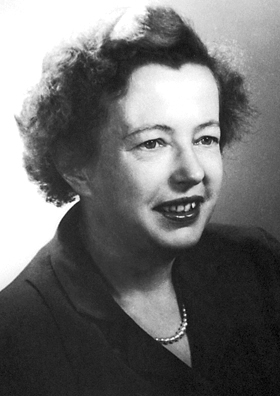
Maria Goeppert-Mayer

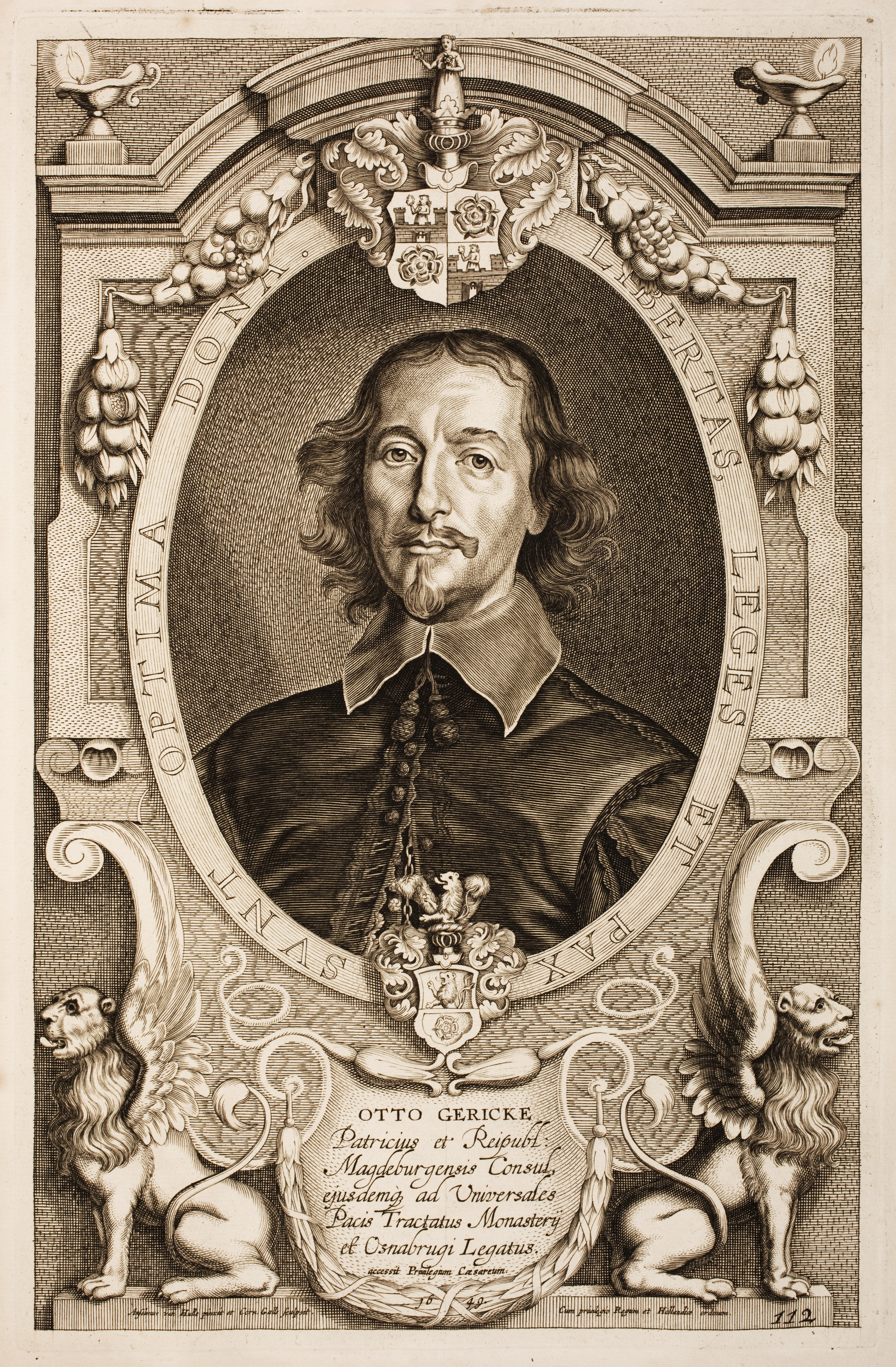
Otto von Guericke

- Wolfgang Gaede
- Otto Willi Gail
- Richard Gans
- Carl Friedrich Gauss
- Johann Samuel Traugott Gehler
- Ernst Gehrcke
- Hans Geiger
- Theo Geisel
- Hans Friedrich Geitel
- Wolfgang Gentner
- Paul Gerber
- Reimund Gerhard
- Walter Gerlach
- Christian Ludwig Gerling
- Christian Gerthsen
- Franz Josef Giessibl
- Ludwig Wilhelm Gilbert
- Herbert Gleiter
- Karl Glitscher
- Maria Goeppert-Mayer
- Adolf Goetzberger
- Gerhard W. Goetze
- Carl Wolfgang Benjamin Goldschmidt
- Eugen Goldstein
- Fritz Goos
- Walter Gordon
- Göttingen Eighteen
- Florian Goebel
- Wolfgang Götze
- Leo Graetz
- Robert Graham
- Daniel Gralath
- Hans Grassmann
- Hermann Grassmann
- Markus Greiner
- Walter Greiner
- Rudolf Grimm
- Claudius Gros
- Siegfried Grossmann
- Wilhelm Groth
- Helmut Gröttrup
- Peter Grünberg
- Eduard Grüneisen
- Otto von Guericke
- Peter Gumbsch
- Sibylle Günter

== H ==
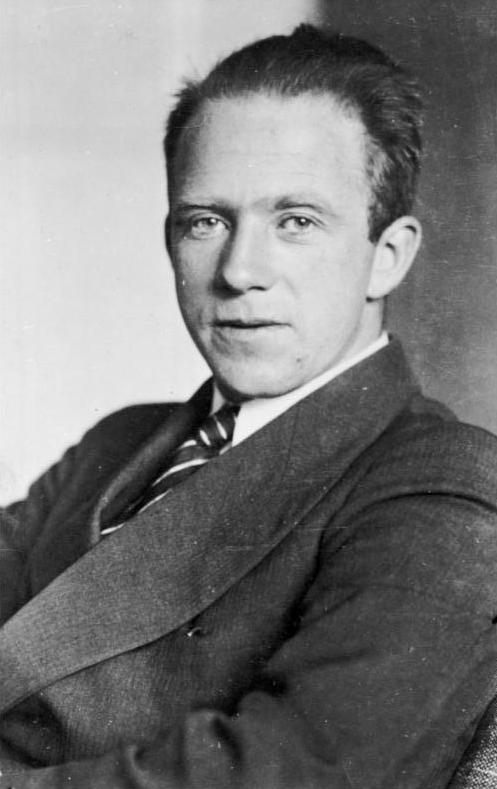
Werner Heisenberg

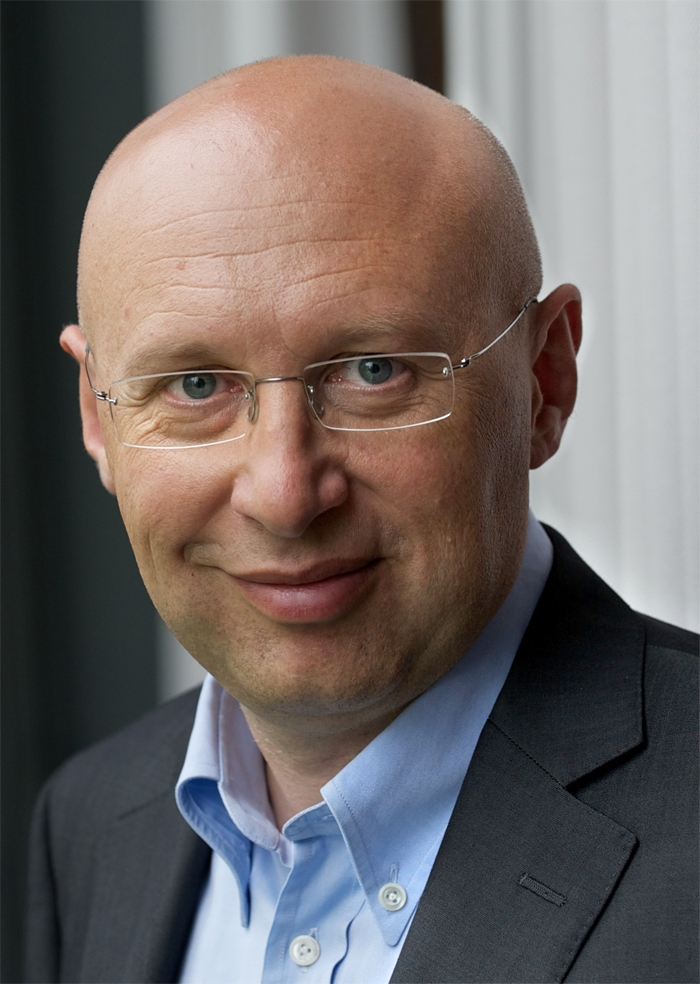
Stefan Hell

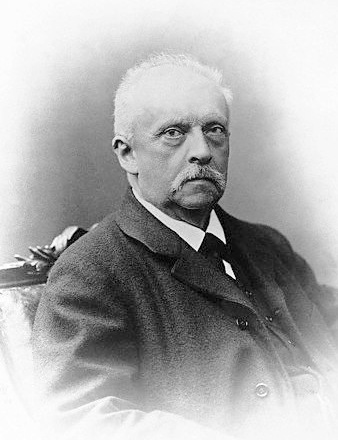
Hermann von Helmholtz

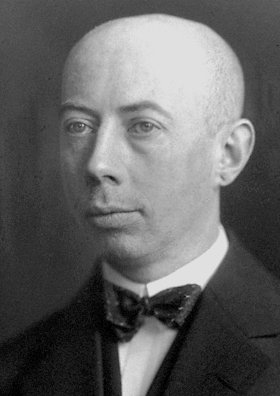
Gustav Hertz

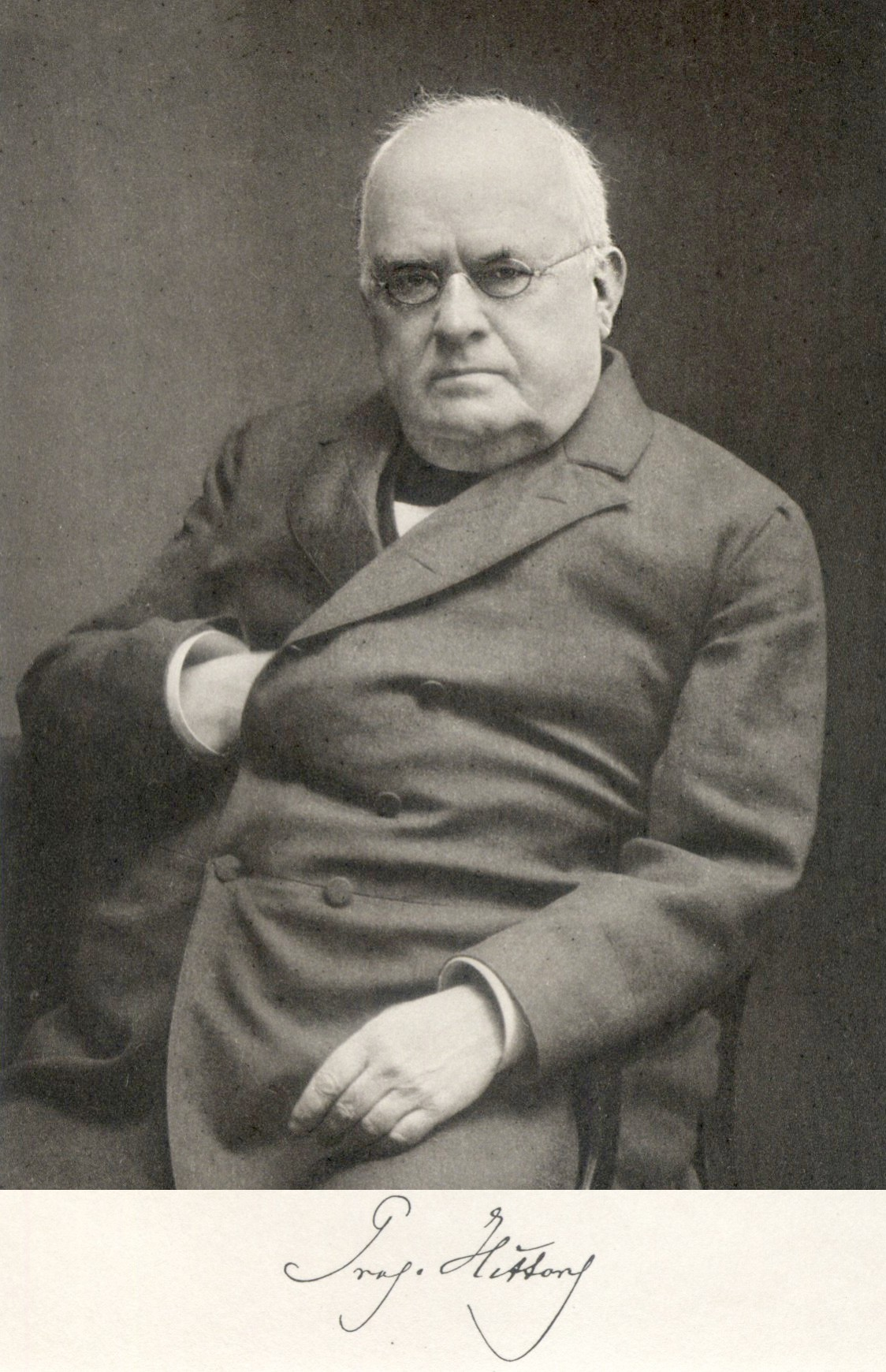
Johann Wilhelm Hittorf

- Rudolf Haag
- Heinz Haber
- Rolf Hagedorn
- Gotthilf Hagen
- Hermann Haken
- Wilhelm Hallwachs
- Thomas Hamacher
- Hilda Hänchen
- Wilhelm Hanle
- Theodor W. Hänsch
- Hauke Harder
- Johannes Franz Hartmann
- Werner Hartmann
- Elena Hassinger
- Christian August Hausen
- Isolde Hausser
- Otto Haxel
- Oskar Heil
- Burkhard Heim
- Jochen Heisenberg
- Werner Heisenberg
- Walter Heitler
- Wolfgang Helfrich
- Stefan Hell
- Hans Hellmann
- Hermann von Helmholtz
- Thomas Henning
- Klaus Hentschel
- Carl Hermann
- Grete Hermann
- Stephan Herminghaus
- Walter Herrmann
- Gustav Ludwig Hertz
- Heinrich Hertz
- Gerhard Herzberg
- Maximilian Herzberger
- Rolf-Dieter Heuer
- Burkard Hillebrands
- Arthur R. von Hippel
- Johann Wilhelm Hittorf
- Karl-Heinz Höcker
- Hanna von Hoerner
- Sebastian von Hoerner
- Ulrich Höfer
- Gerhard Hoffmann
- Sigurd Hofmann
- Hans Hollmann
- Wilhelm Holtz
- Michael Holzscheiter
- Helmut Hönl
- Ludwig Hopf
- Walter Hoppe
- Heinrich Hora
- Wilhelm Hort
- Sabine Hossenfelder
- Fritz Houtermans
- Alfred Hübler
- Erich Hückel
- Friedrich Hund
- Hans-Hermann Hupfeld
- Roland Hüttenrauch

== I ==
- Maximus von Imhof
- Caspar Isenkrahe
- Ernst Ising
- Patrick Ilg

== J ==
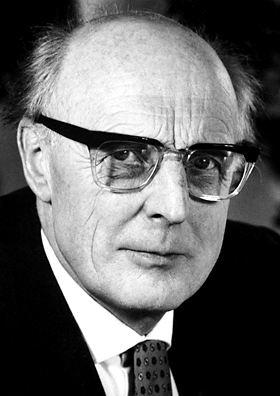
Johannes Hans Daniel Jensen

- Max Jakob
- J. Hans D. Jensen
- Peter Herbert Jensen
- Willibald Jentschke
- Sabina Jeschke
- Viktor K. Jirsa
- Johann Gottfried Teske
- Philipp von Jolly
- Claus Jönsson
- Georg Joos
- Pascual Jordan
- Johannes Juilfs

== K ==
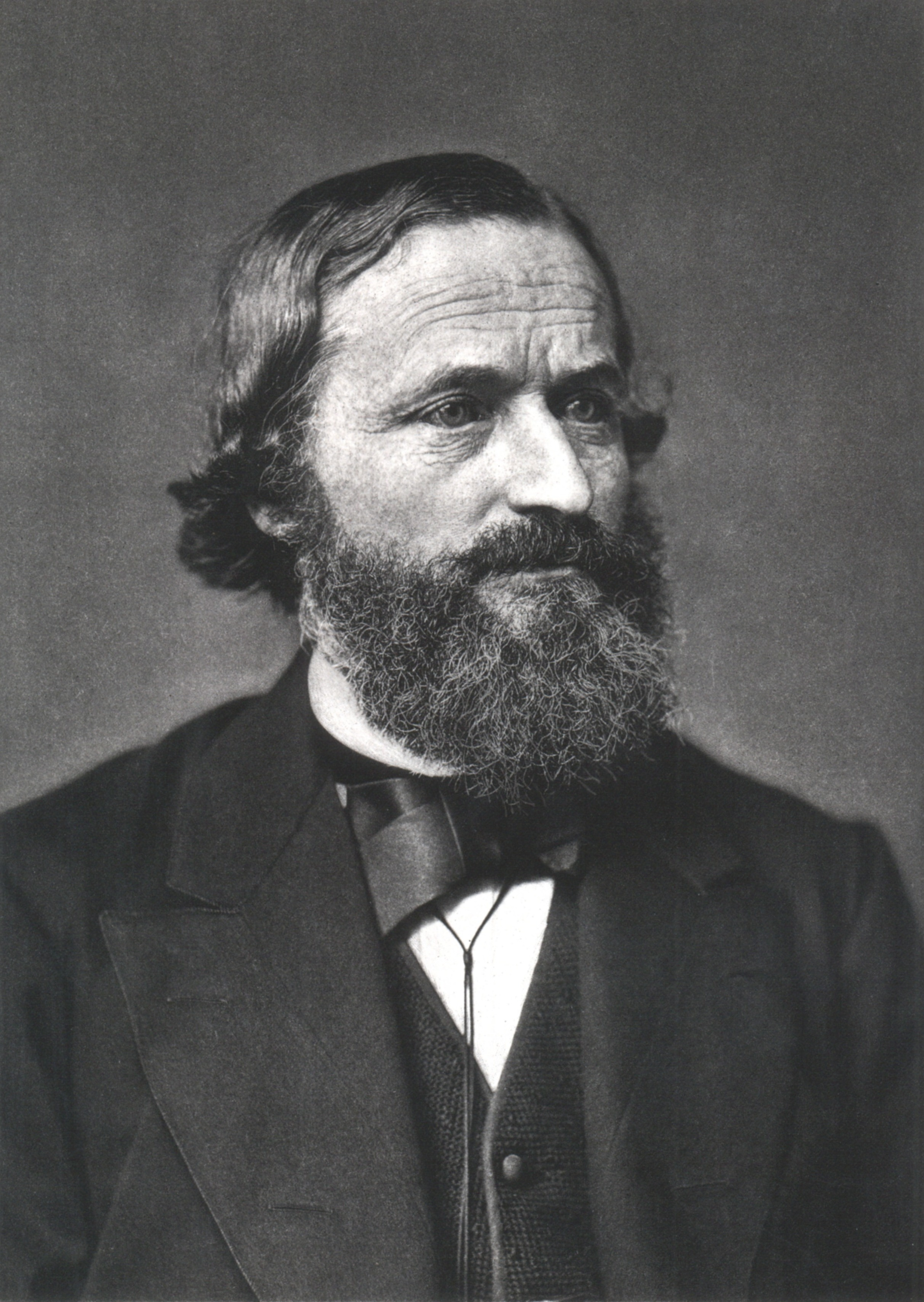
Gustav Robert Kirchhoff

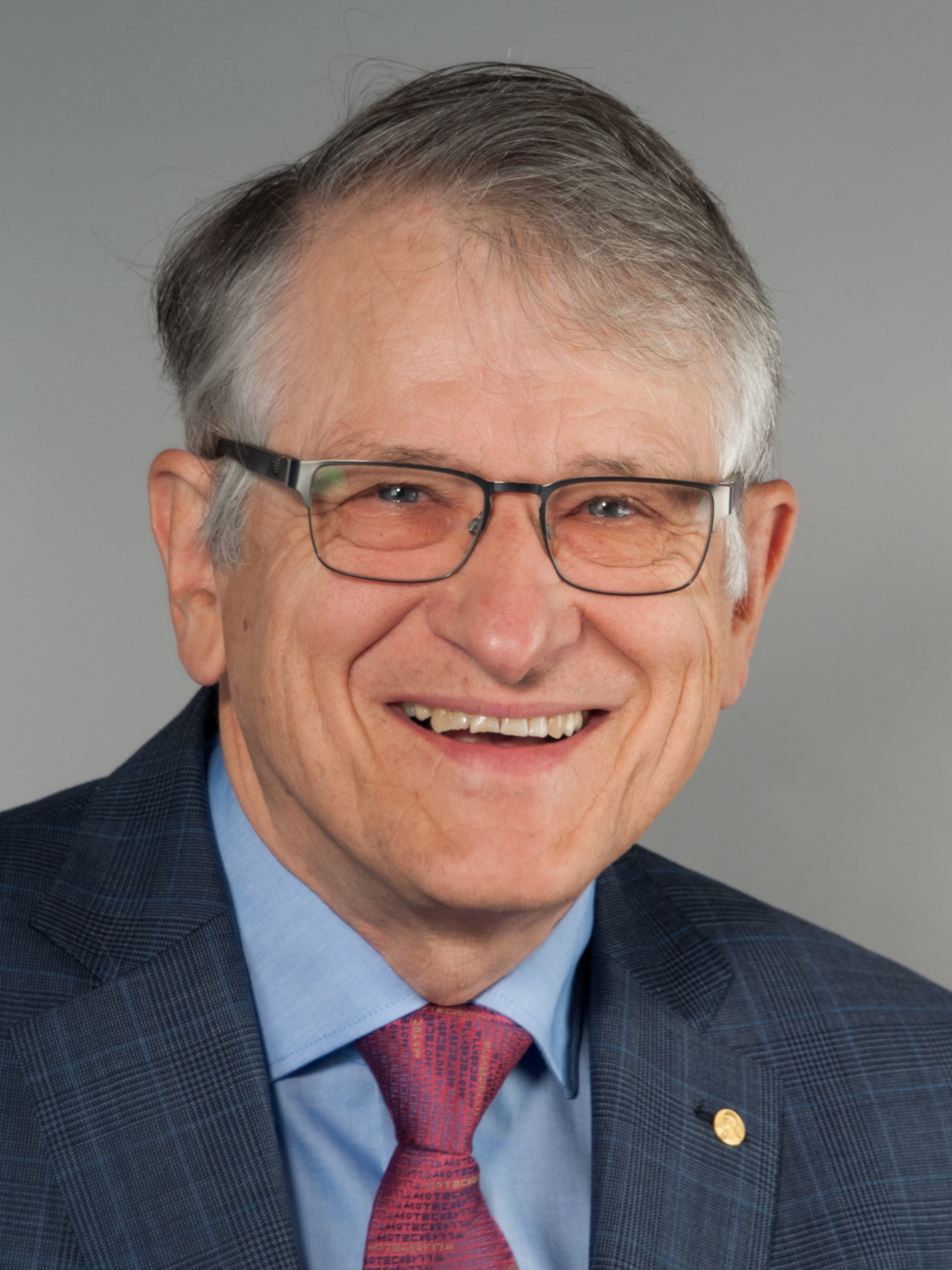
Klau von Klitzing

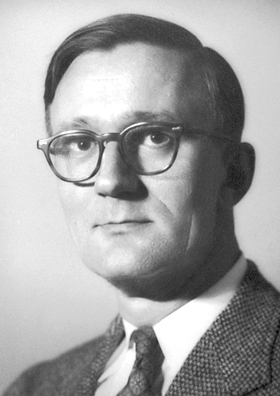
Polykarp Kusch

- Wolfgang Kaiser
- Willi A. Kalender
- Salomon Kalischer
- Hartmut Kallmann
- Theodor Kaluza
- Karl Strehl
- Gustav Karsten
- Hermann Karsten
- Ralph Kaufmann
- Walter Kaufmann
- Heinrich Kayser
- Bernhard Keimer
- Christoph Helmut Keitel
- Nicholas Kemmer
- Julia Kempe
- Klaus Kern
- Johannes Kepler
- Boris Kerner
- Wolfgang Ketterle
- Karl-Otto Kiepenheuer
- Karl Johann Kiessling
- Erhard Kietz
- Gustav Kirchhoff
- Hans Volker Klapdor-Kleingrothaus
- Hagen Kleinert
- Ewald Georg von Kleist
- Otto Klemperer
- Gerhard Klimeck
- Klaus von Klitzing
- Heinz-Jürgen Kluge
- Hermann Knoblauch
- Stephan W. Koch
- Rudolph Koenig
- Friedrich Kohlrausch
- Rudolf Kohlrausch
- Hedwig Kohn
- Werner Kolhörster
- Heinrich Konen
- Arthur König
- Hans Kopfermann
- Arthur Korn
- Horst Korsching
- Walther Kossel
- Wolfgang Ludwig Krafft
- Gerhard Kraft
- Wolfgang Krätschmer
- Michael Kramer
- Christian Gottlieb Kratzenstein
- Adolf Kratzer
- Karl Kraus
- Dirk Kreimer
- Kurt Kremer
- Erich Kretschmann
- Herbert Kroemer
- August Krönig
- Bernd J. Kröger
- Ralph Kronig
- Eckhard Krotscheck
- Rudolf Kühnhold
- Helmuth Kulenkampff
- August Kundt
- Adolph Theodor Kupffer
- Jochen Küpper
- Ferdinand Kurlbaum
- Jürgen Kurths
- Polykarp Kusch

== L ==
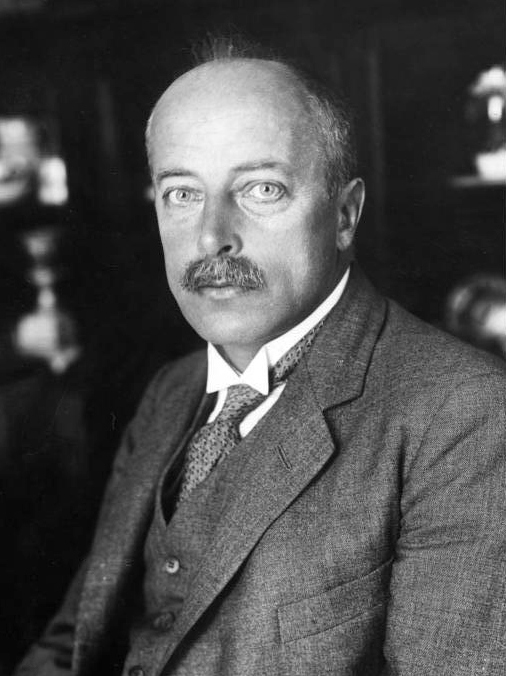
Max von Laue

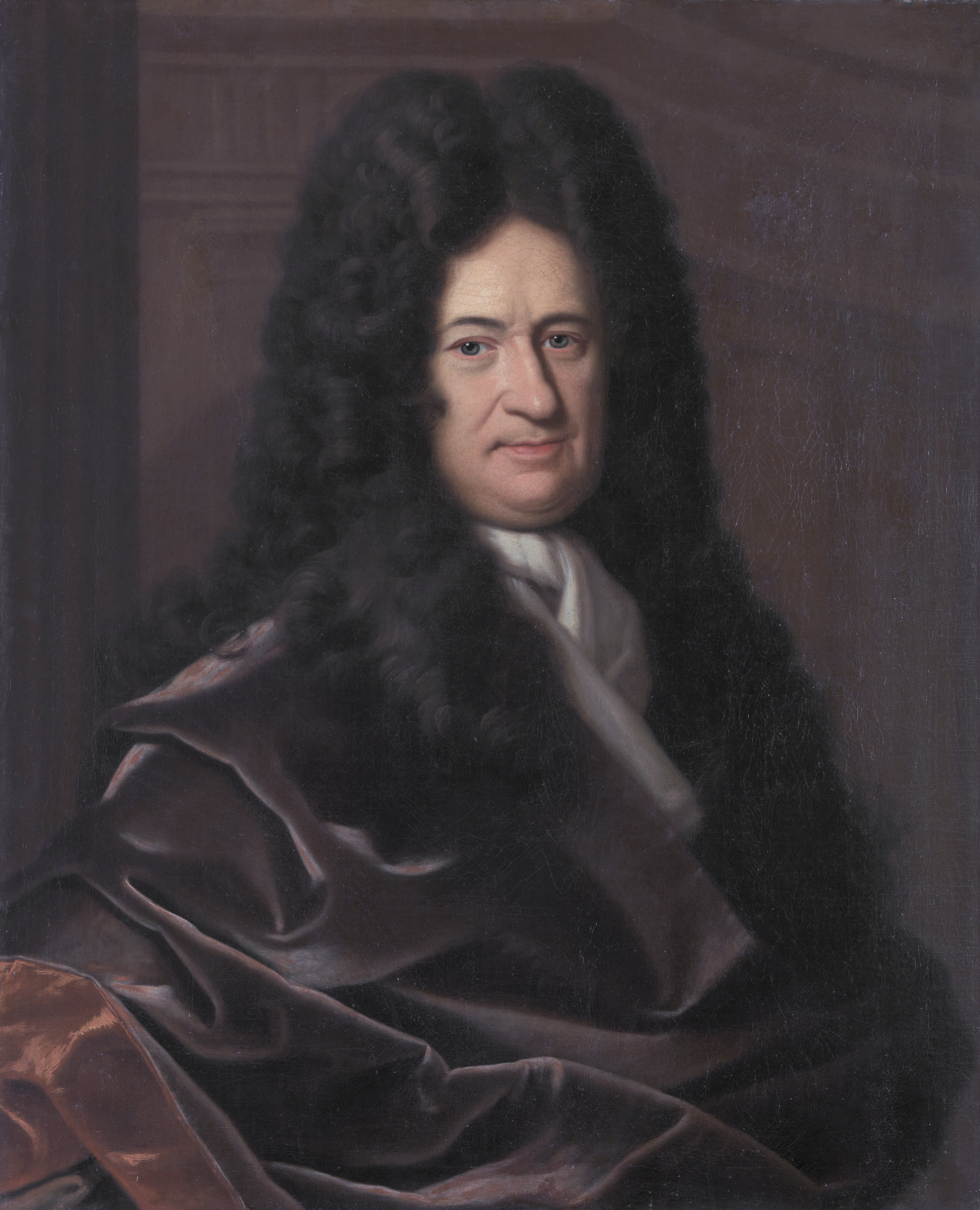
Gottfried Wilhelm Leibniz

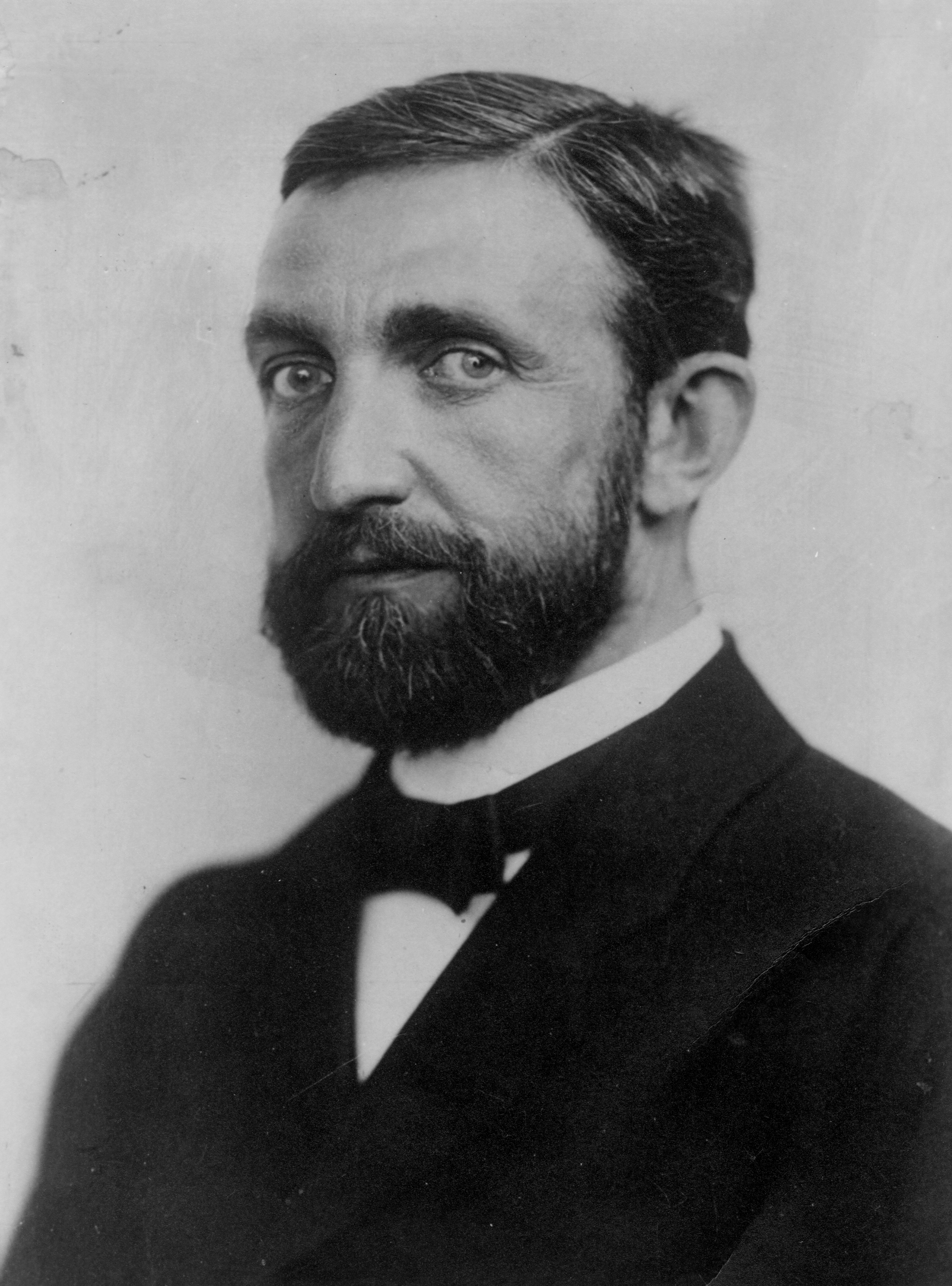
Philipp Lenard

- Rudolf Ladenburg
- Johann von Lamont
- Rolf Landauer
- Alfred Landé
- Gottfried Landwehr
- Dieter Langbein
- Ludwig Lange
- Otto Laporte
- Gerda Laski
- Jakob Laub
- Max von Laue
- Harry Lehmann
- Otto Lehmann
- Gottfried Wilhelm Leibniz
- Philipp Lenard
- Emil Lenz
- Wilhelm Lenz
- Karl Leo
- Ulf Leonhardt
- Harald Lesch
- Hajo Leschke
- Jacob Leupold
- Hilde Levi
- Willy Ley
- Georg Christoph Lichtenberg
- Manfred Lindner
- Detlef Lohse
- Renate Loll
- Eugen von Lommel
- Gerhart Lüders
- Christian Ludwig
- Otto Lummer
- Dieter Lüst
- Reimar Lüst
- Josef Lutz

== M ==
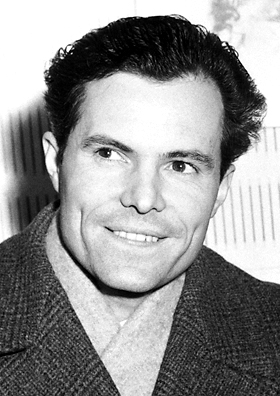
Rudolf Mössbauer

- Erwin Madelung
- Heinrich Gustav Magnus
- Heinz Maier-Leibnitz
- Christoph von der Malsburg
- Jochen Mannhart
- Reinhold Mannkopff
- Herman March
- Henry Margenau
- Thomas Martinetz
- Herbert Mataré
- Gerhard Materlik
- Josef Mattauch
- Dieter Matthaei
- Hans Ferdinand Mayer
- Julius von Mayer
- Reinhard Mecke
- Reinhard Meinel
- Karl Meissner
- Walther Meissner
- Josef Meixner
- Franz Melde
- Angela Merkel
- Ulrich Mescheder
- Karl Mey
- Werner Meyer-Eppler
- Hajo Meyer
- Oskar Emil Meyer
- Theodor Meyer
- Rolf Michel
- Gustav Mie
- Jürgen Mlynek
- Dieter Möhl
- Richard Mollier
- Kurd von Mosengeil
- Rudolf Mössbauer
- Erwin Wilhelm Müller
- Justus Mühlenpfordt
- Harald J. W. Mueller-Kirsten
- Johann Heinrich Jakob Müller
- Klaus-Robert Müller
- Walther Müller
- Wilhelm Müller
- Georg Wilhelm Muncke
- Gottfried Münzenberg

== N ==
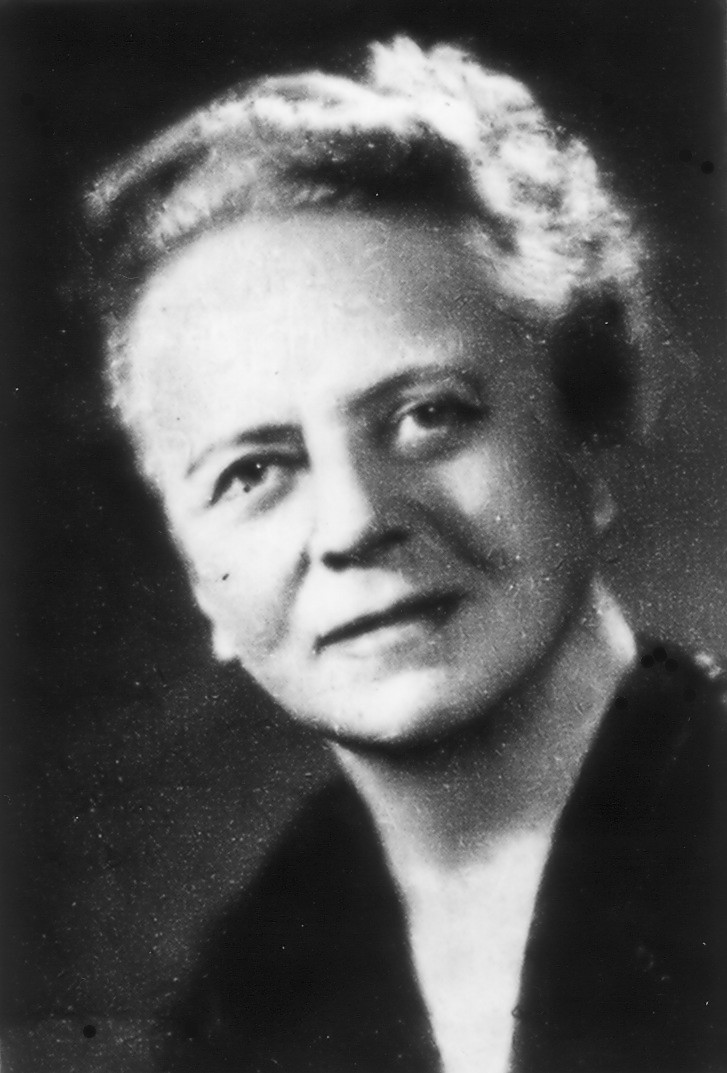
Ida Noddack

- Werner Nahm
- Elsa Neumann
- Franz Ernst Neumann
- Roger G. Newton
- Gereon Niedner-Schatteburg
- Alexander Nikuradse
- Johann Nikuradse
- Günter Nimtz
- Ida Noddack
- Emmy Noether
- Bengt Nölting
- Lothar Wolfgang Nordheim
- Johann Gottlieb Nörremberg

== O ==
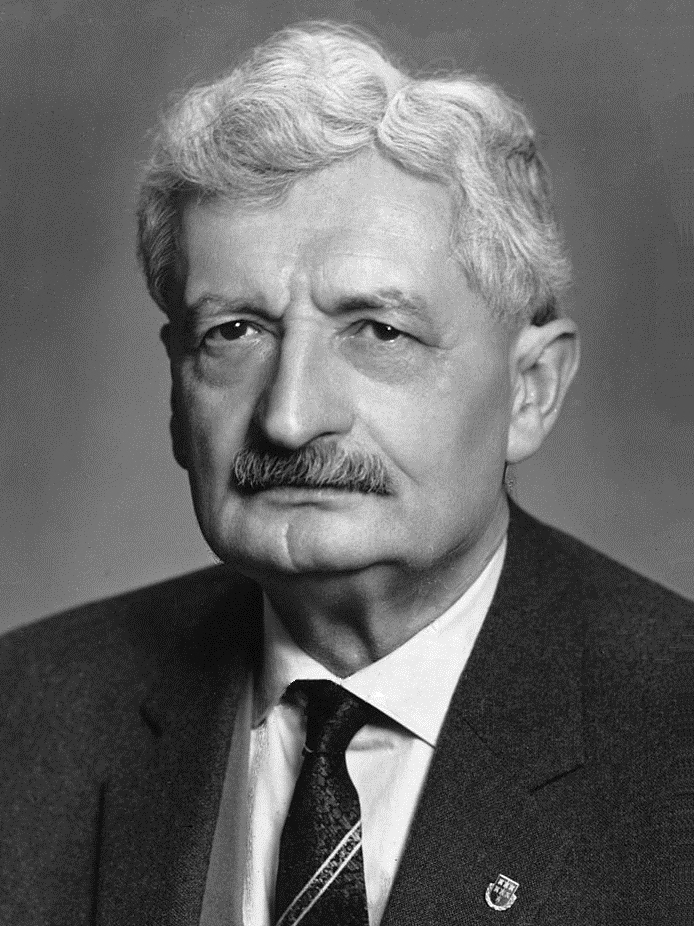
Hermann Oberth

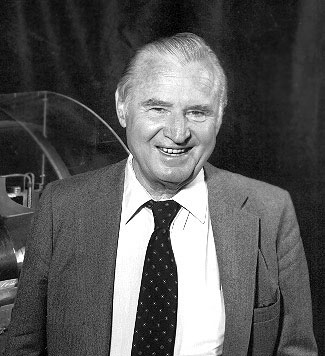
Hans von Ohain

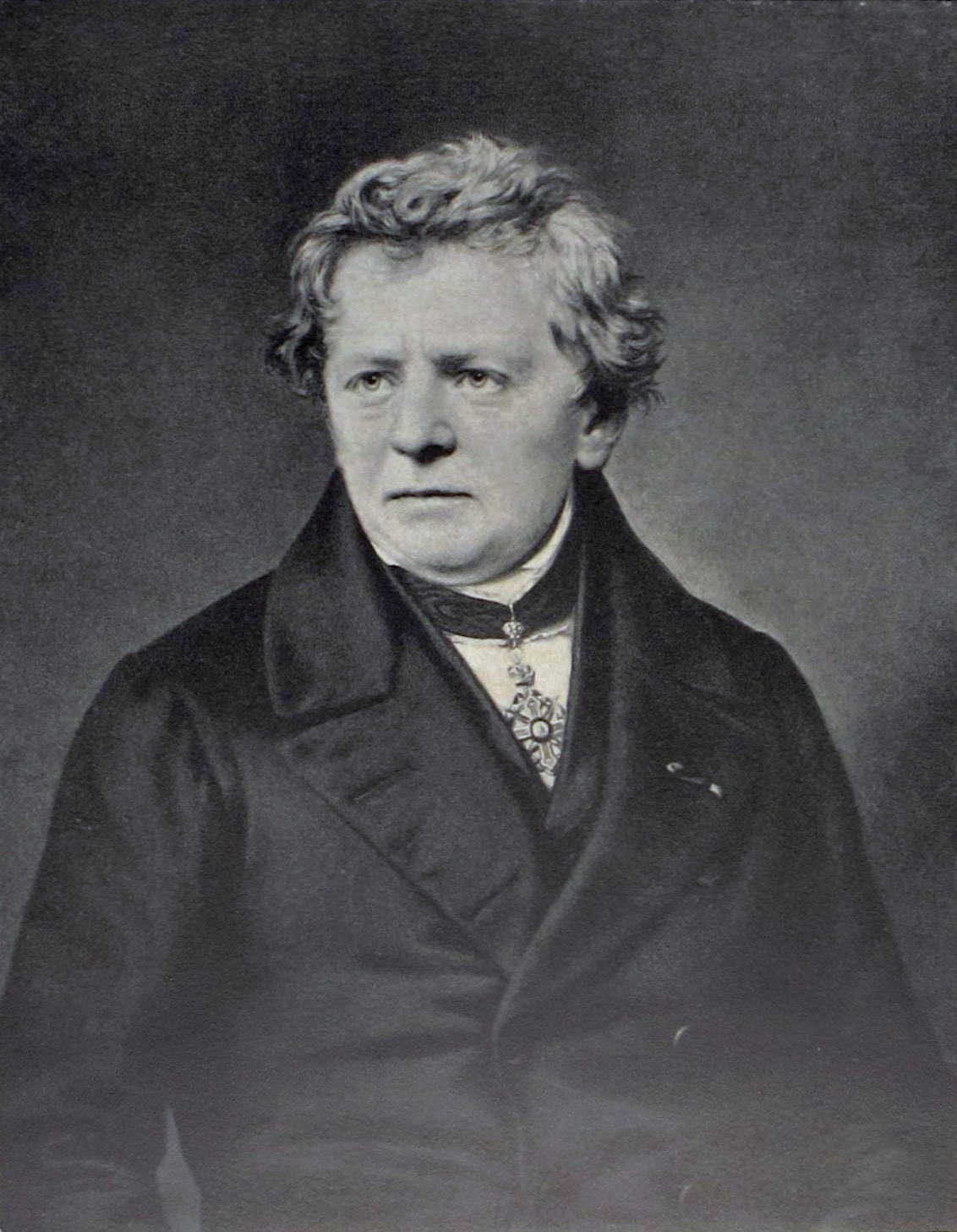
Georg Simon Ohm

- Anton Oberbeck
- Hermann Oberth
- Robert Ochsenfeld
- Reinhard Oehme
- Walter Oelert
- Arthur von Oettingen
- Hans von Ohain
- Georg Ohm
- Heinrich Wilhelm Matthias Olbers
- Johannes Orphal
- Wilhelm Orthmann
- Gottfried Osann
- Heinrich Ott

== P ==
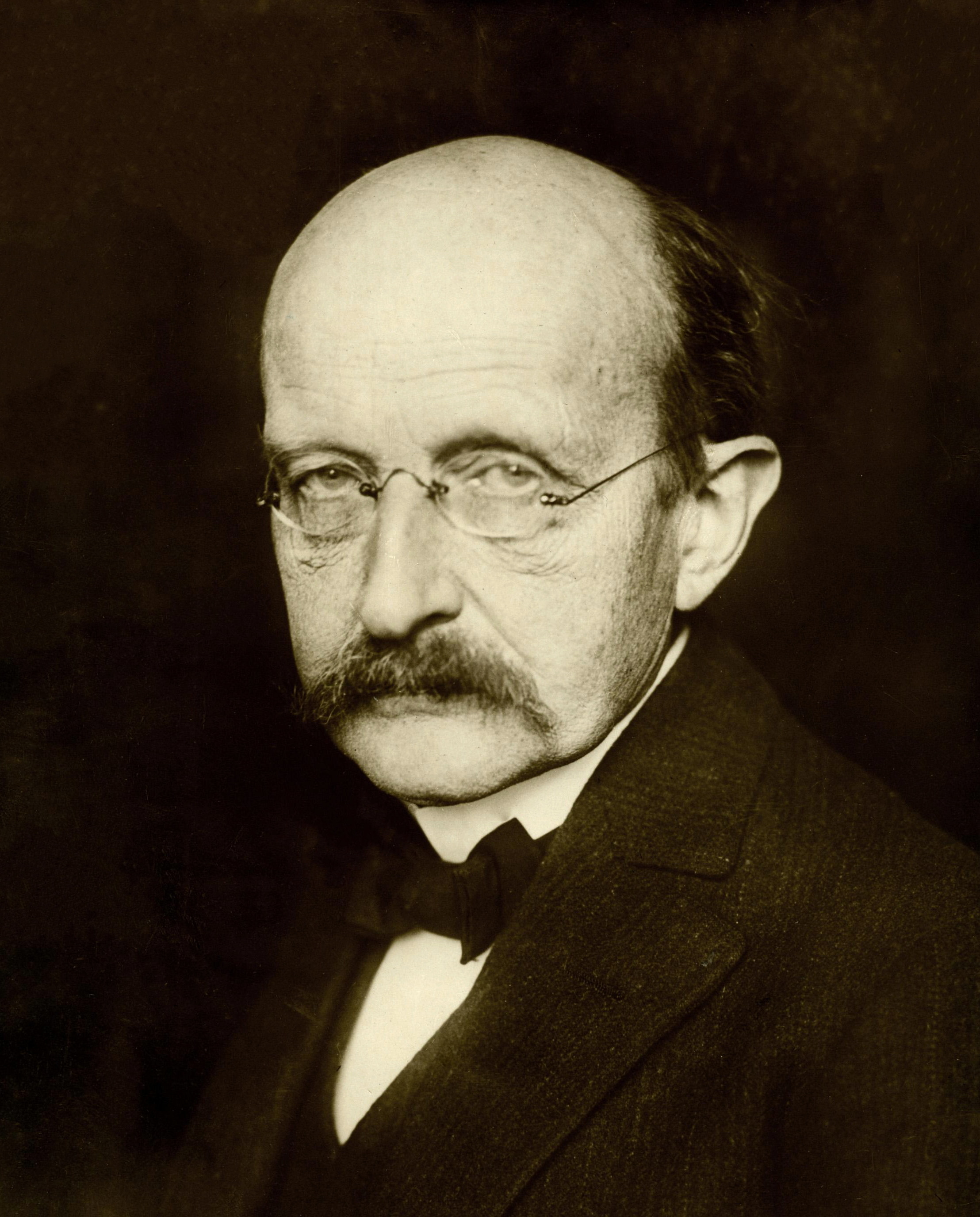
Max Planck

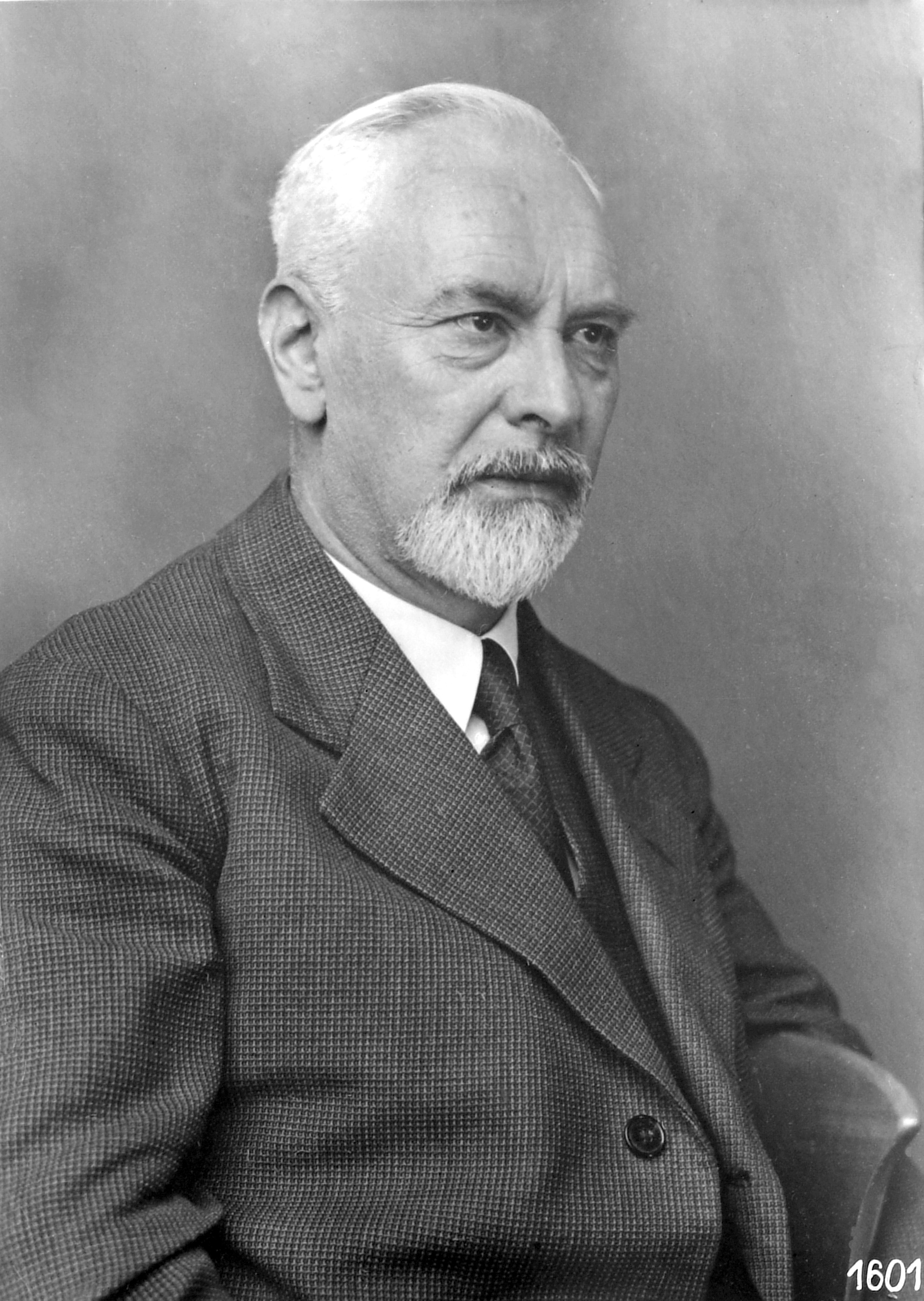
Ludwig Prandtl

- Friedrich Paschen
- Wolfgang Paul
- Rudolf Peierls
- Christoph Heinrich Pfaff
- Franz Pfeiffer
- Georg Pfotzer
- Bernhard Philberth
- Marcello Pirani
- Max Planck
- Jan Christoph Plefka
- Martin Bodo Plenio
- Julius Plücker
- Agnes Pockels
- Friedrich Carl Alwin Pockels
- Johann Christian Poggendorff
- Dieter Pohl
- Robert Pohl
- Fritz-Albert Popp
- Heinz Pose
- Ludwig Prandtl
- Fritz Karl Preikschat
- Ernst Pringsheim Sr.
- Carl Pulfrich

== Q ==
- Hans-Joachim Queisser
- Georg Hermann Quincke

== R ==
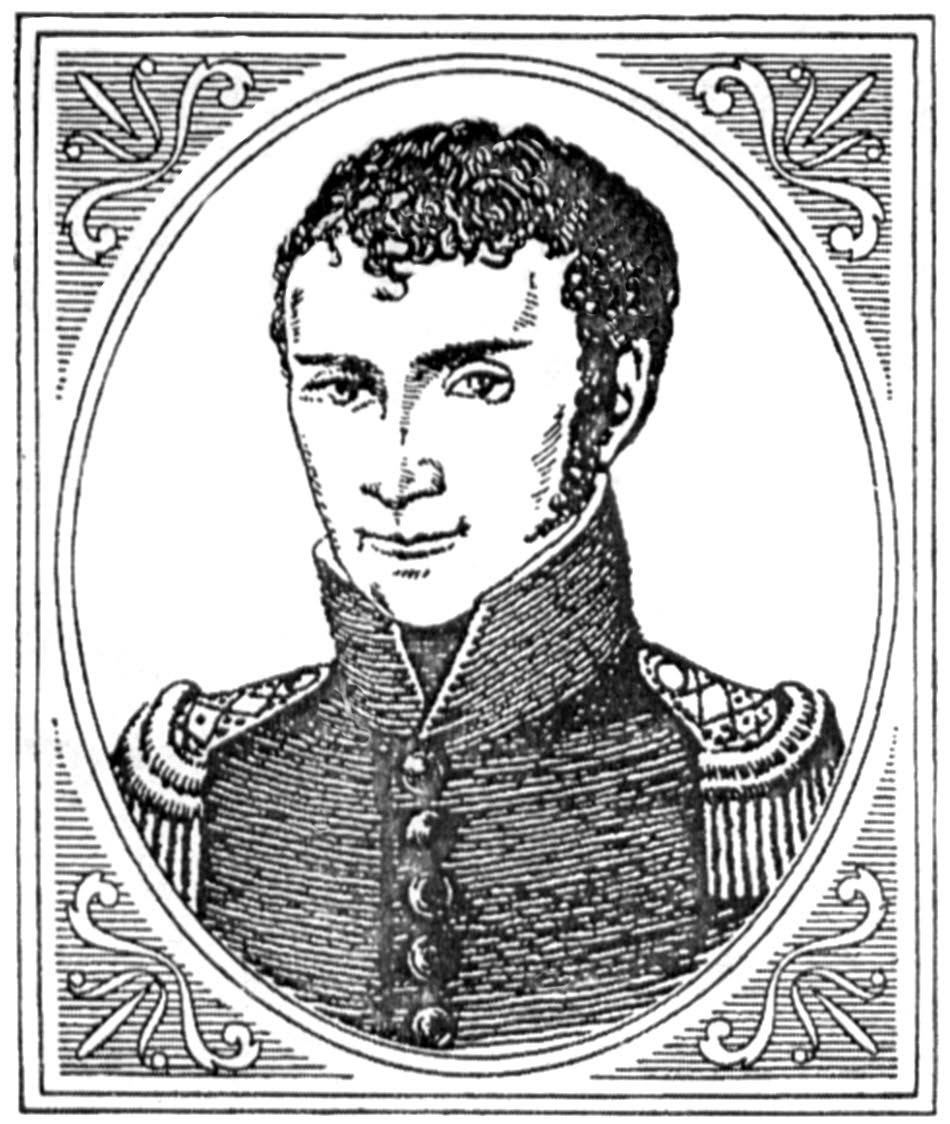
Johann Wilhelm Ritter

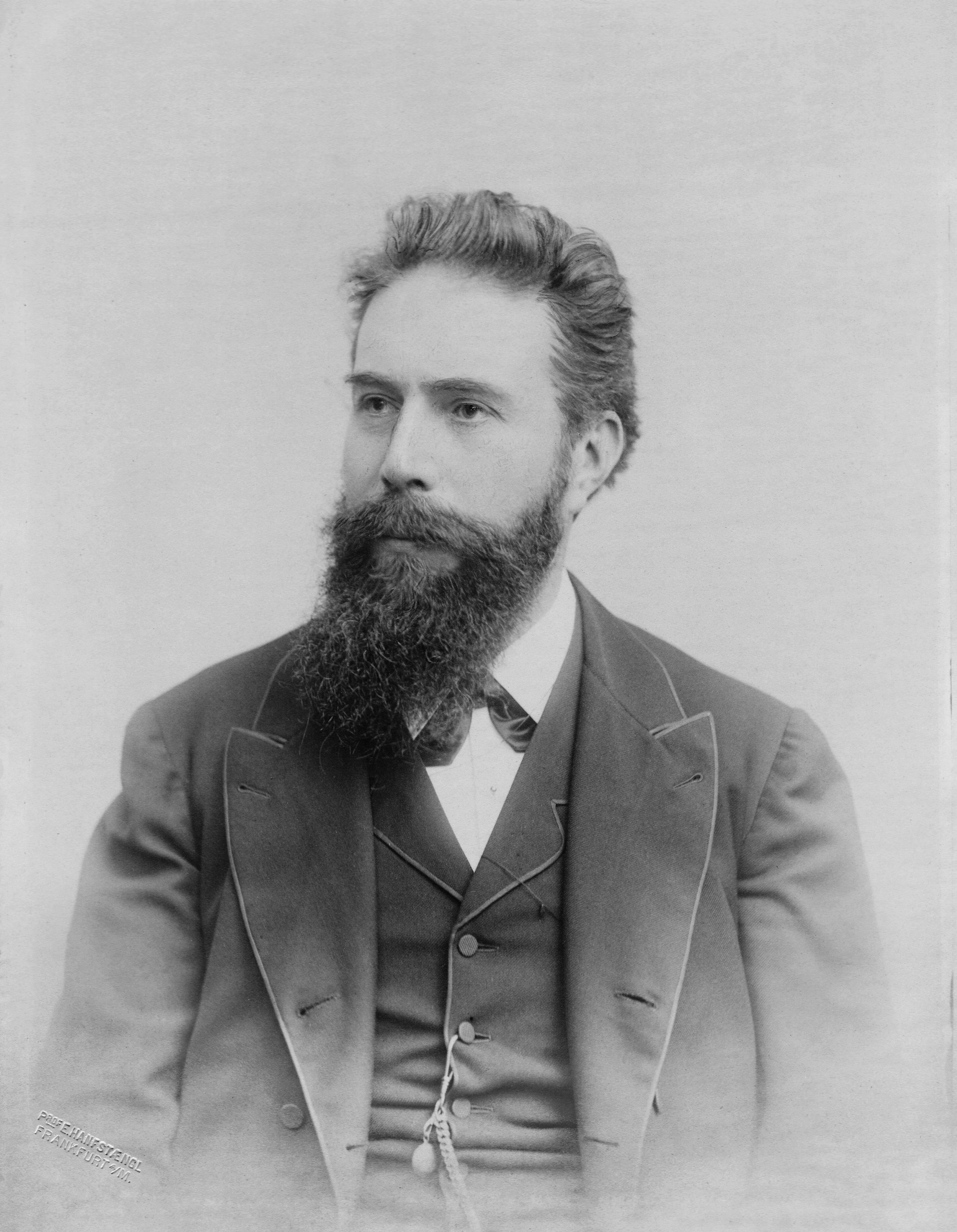
Wilhelm Röntgen

- Jürgen P. Rabe
- Johann Rafelski
- Carl Ramsauer
- Karl Rawer
- Erich Regener
- Karl-Henning Rehren
- Werner E. Reichardt
- Fritz Reiche
- Hans Reissner
- Gerhard Rempe
- Jürgen Renn
- Mauritius Renninger
- Ernst Rexer
- Franz Richarz
- Georg Wilhelm Richmann
- Achim Richter
- Klaus Riedle
- Charlotte Riefenstahl
- Peter Theophil Riess
- Karl-Heinrich Riewe
- Johann Wilhelm Ritter
- Oskar Ritter
- Walter Rogowski
- Wilhelm Röntgen
- Harald Rose
- Ilse Rosenthal-Schneider
- Heinrich Rubens
- Andreas Rüdiger
- Paul Rudolph
- Carl David Tolmé Runge
- Iris Runge
- Wilhelm Runge
- Ernst Ruska

== S ==
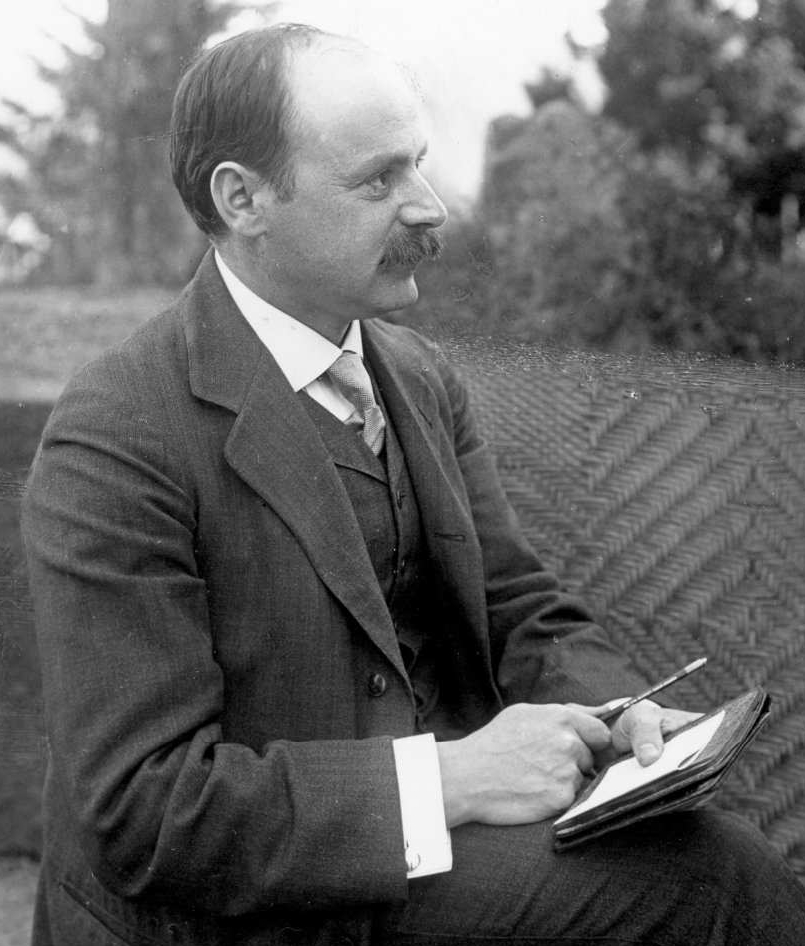
Karl Schwarzschild

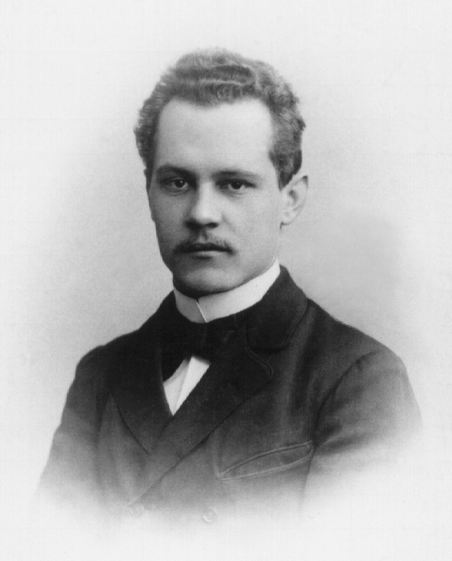
Arnold Sommerfeld

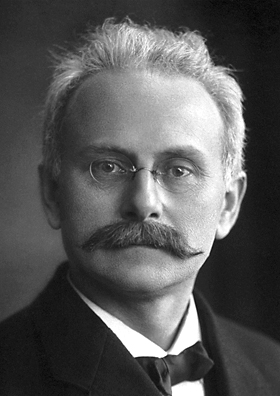
Johannes Stark

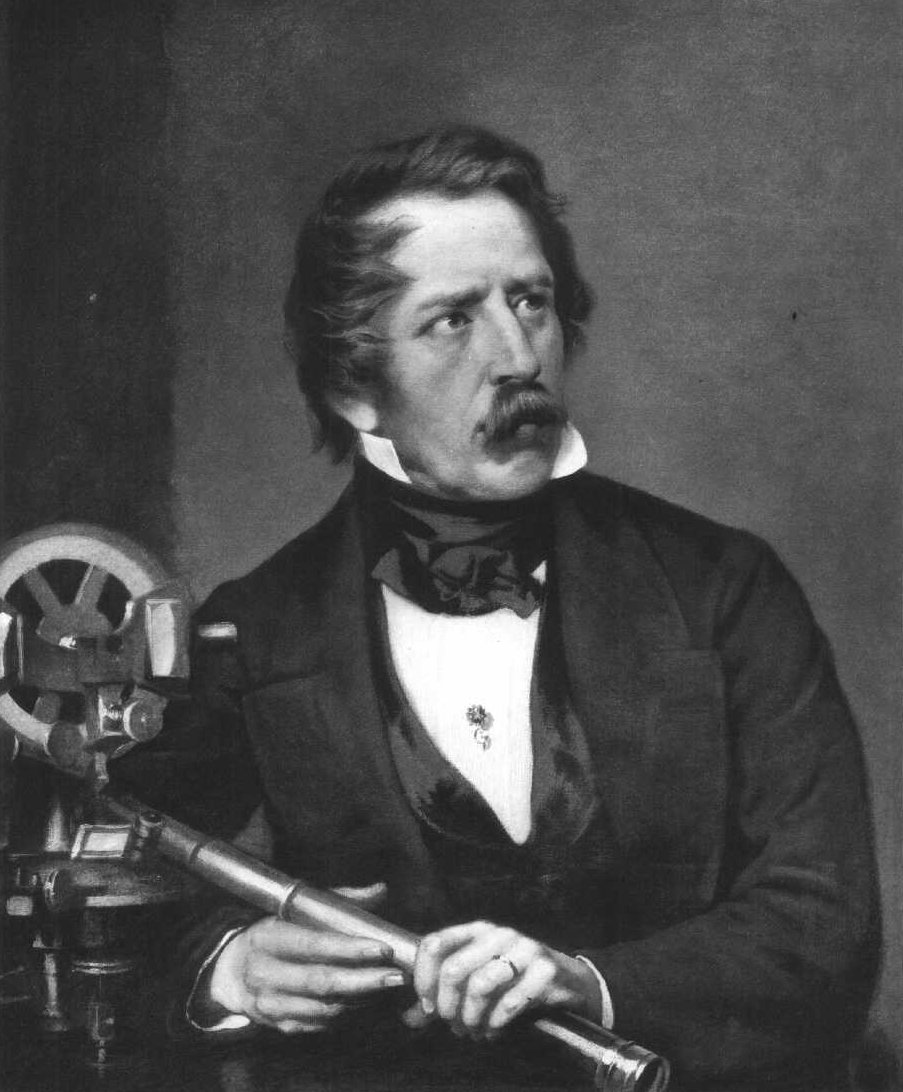
Carl August Steinheil

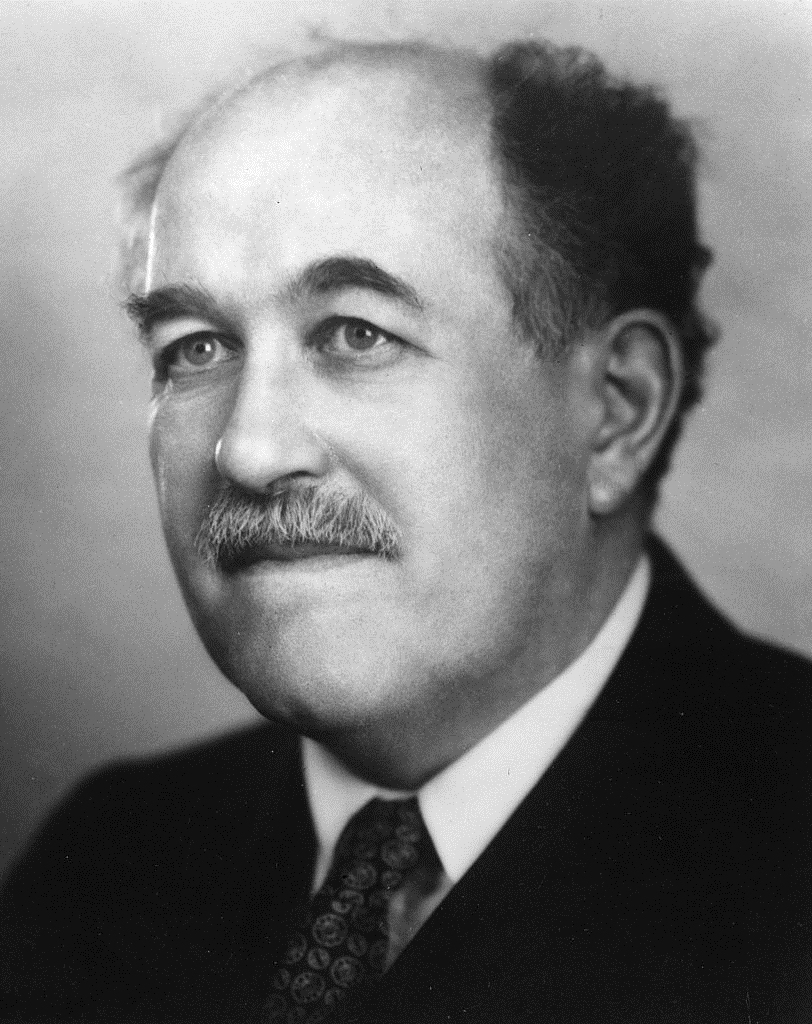
Otto Stern

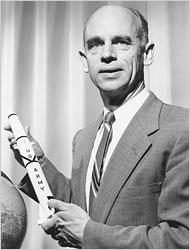
Ernst Stuhlinger

- Erich Sackmann
- Corinna Salander
- Wolfgang Sandner
- Fritz Sauter
- Fritz Peter Schäfer
- Hendrik Schatz
- Karl Scheel
- Jens Scheer
- Frank Scheffold
- Valentin Scheidel
- Christoph Scheiner
- Hans Joachim Schellnhuber
- Harald Schering
- Otto Scherzer
- Josef Schintlmeister
- Dagmar Schipanski
- Wolfgang P. Schleich
- Helmut Schmidt
- Jürgen Schmitt
- Inge Schmitz-Feuerhake
- Eckehard Schöll
- Jan Hendrik Schön
- Gaspar Schott
- Walter H. Schottky
- Heinrich G. F. Schröder
- Elmar Schrüfer
- Manfred R. Schroeder
- Bert Schroer
- Engelbert Schücking
- Helmut W. Schulz
- Erich Schumann
- Victor Schumann
- Manfred Schüssler
- Karl Schwarzschild
- Martin Schwarzschild
- Gerhard Schwehm
- Achim Schwenk
- Johann Schweigger
- August Seebeck
- Thomas Johann Seebeck
- Rudolf Seeliger
- Jens Seipenbusch
- Walter Selke
- Ludwig August Seeber
- Henry Siedentopf
- Paul Eugen Sieg
- Francis Simon
- Hermann Theodor Simon
- Paul Söding
- Johann Georg von Soldner
- Arnold Sommerfeld
- Eckehard Specht
- Johann Sperling
- Hertha Sponer
- Johannes Stark
- Matthias Staudacher
- Max Steenbeck
- Carl August von Steinheil
- Hans Stephani
- Otto Stern
- Ernest J. Sternglass
- Georg Stetter
- Horst Stöcker
- Hans-Jürgen Stöckmann
- Horst Ludwig Störmer
- Herbert Arthur Stuart
- Hildegard Stücklen
- Ernst Stuhlinger
- Kurt Symanzik

== T ==
- Gustav Heinrich Tammann
- Michel Ter-Pogossian
- Friedrich-Karl Thielemann
- Uwe Thumm
- Bruno Thüring
- Clemens Timpler
- Johann Daniel Titius
- August Toepler
- Maximilien Toepler
- Rudolf Tomaschek
- Peter E. Toschek
- Johann Georg Tralles
- Max Trautz
- Hans-Jürgen Treder

== U ==
- Albrecht Unsöld
- Knut Urban

== V ==
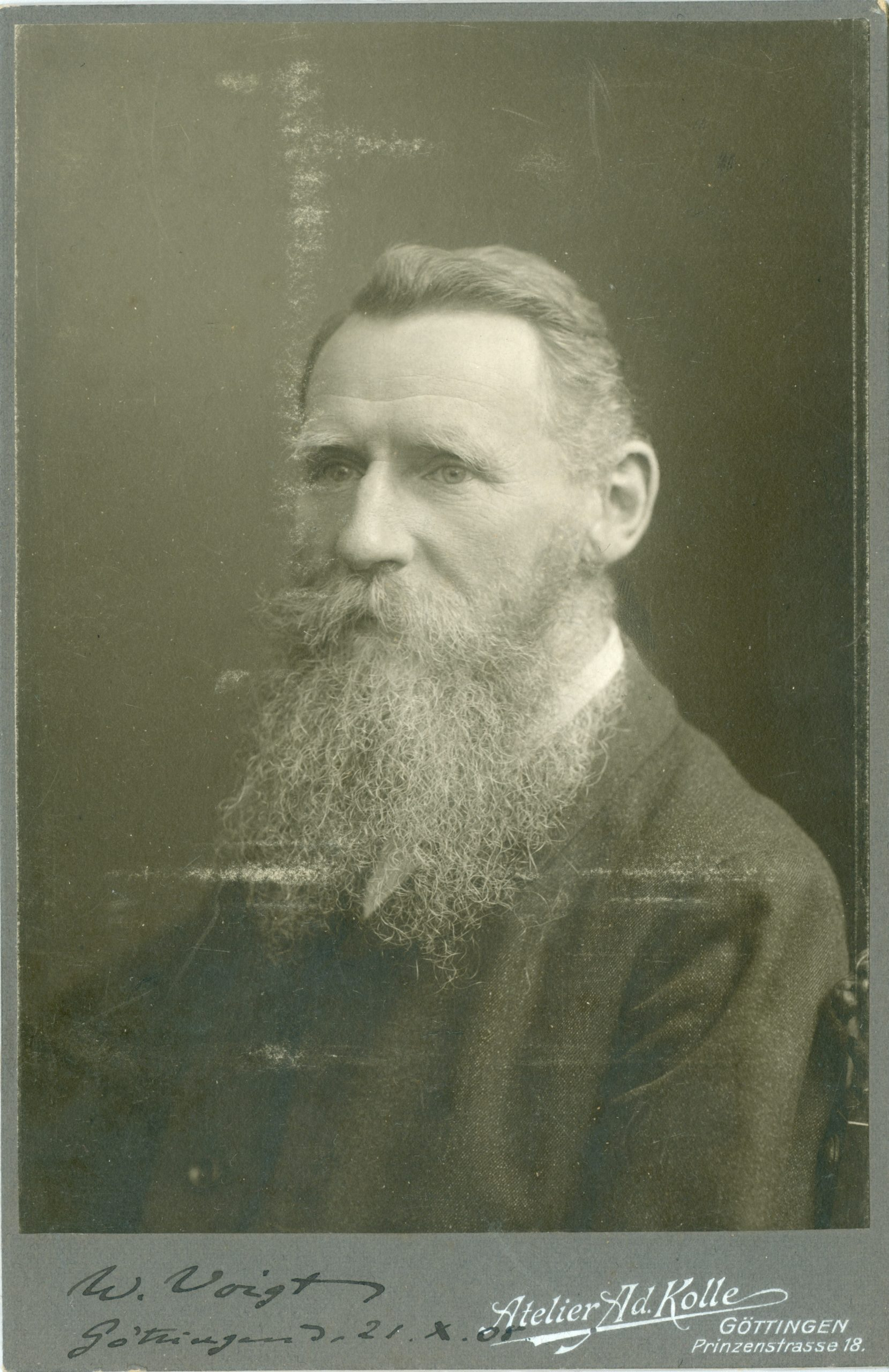
Woldemar Voigt

- Vitello
- Woldemar Voigt
- Dieter Vollhardt
- Helmut Volz

== W ==
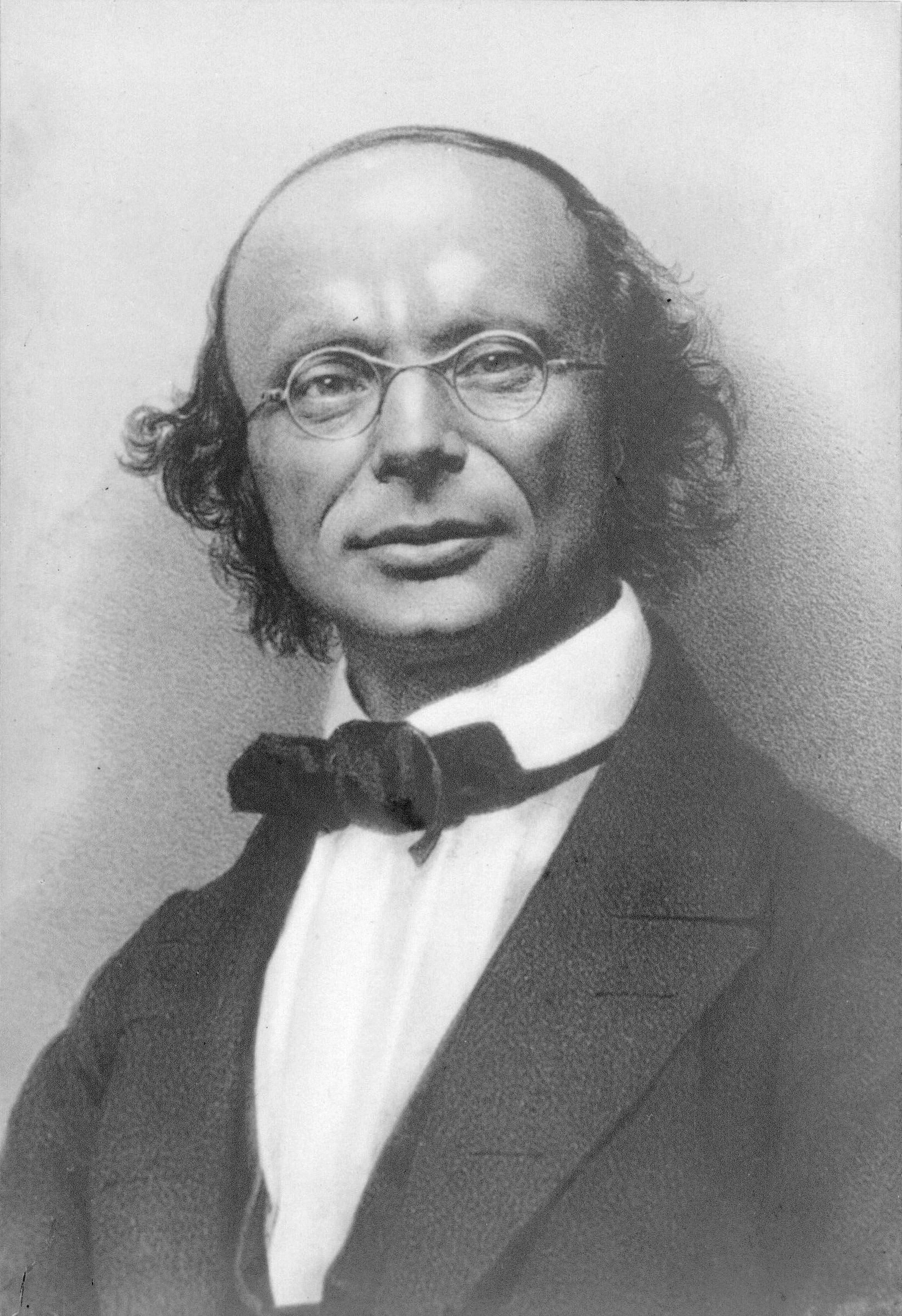
Wilhelm Eduard Weber

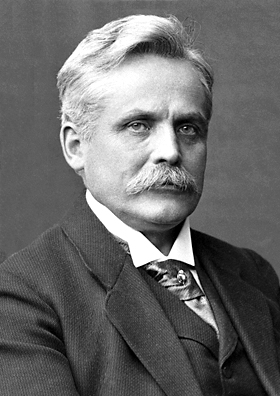
Wilhelm Wien

- Heinrich Karsten Wagenfeld
- Ernst Wagner
- Gerhard Wagner
- Herbert Wagner
- Manfred Wagner
- Wilhelm Walcher
- Ludwig Waldmann
- Andreas Wallraff
- Emil Warburg
- Jürgen Warnatz
- Heinrich Friedrich Weber
- Wilhelm Eduard Weber
- Franz Wegner
- Stephanie Wehner
- Dieter Weichert
- Hans-Arwed Weidenmüller
- Richard M. Weiner
- Silke Weinfurtner
- Max Bernhard Weinstein
- Paul Weiss
- Walter Weizel
- Carl Friedrich von Weizsäcker
- Heinrich Welker
- Katrin Wendland
- Horst Wenninger
- Gregor Wentzel
- Werner Hofmann
- Julius Wess
- Wilhelm Westphal
- Christof Wetterich
- Eilhard Wiedemann
- Gustav Heinrich Wiedemann
- Max Wien
- Wilhelm Wien
- Otto Wiener
- Friedwardt Winterberg
- Karl Wirtz
- Christian Wissel
- Erich Peter Wohlfarth
- Ewald Wollny
- Hans Wolter
- Jörg Wrachtrup
- Theodor Wulf
- Adolf Wüllner
- Gunter Wyszecki
- Wolfgang Kroll

== Z ==
- Joseph Zähringer
- H. Dieter Zeh
- Alfred Zehe
- Elmar Zeitler
- Karl Eduard Zetzsche
- Gustav Zeuner
- Hans K. Ziegler
- Karl Zimmer
- Wolfhart Zimmermann
- Annette Zippelius
- Martin Zirnbauer
- Johann Karl Friedrich Zöllner
- Hartmut Zohm
- Georg Zundel

== See also ==
- List of physicists
- List of German inventions and discoveries
- Science and technology in Germany
