= Lutz Feld =

German physicist

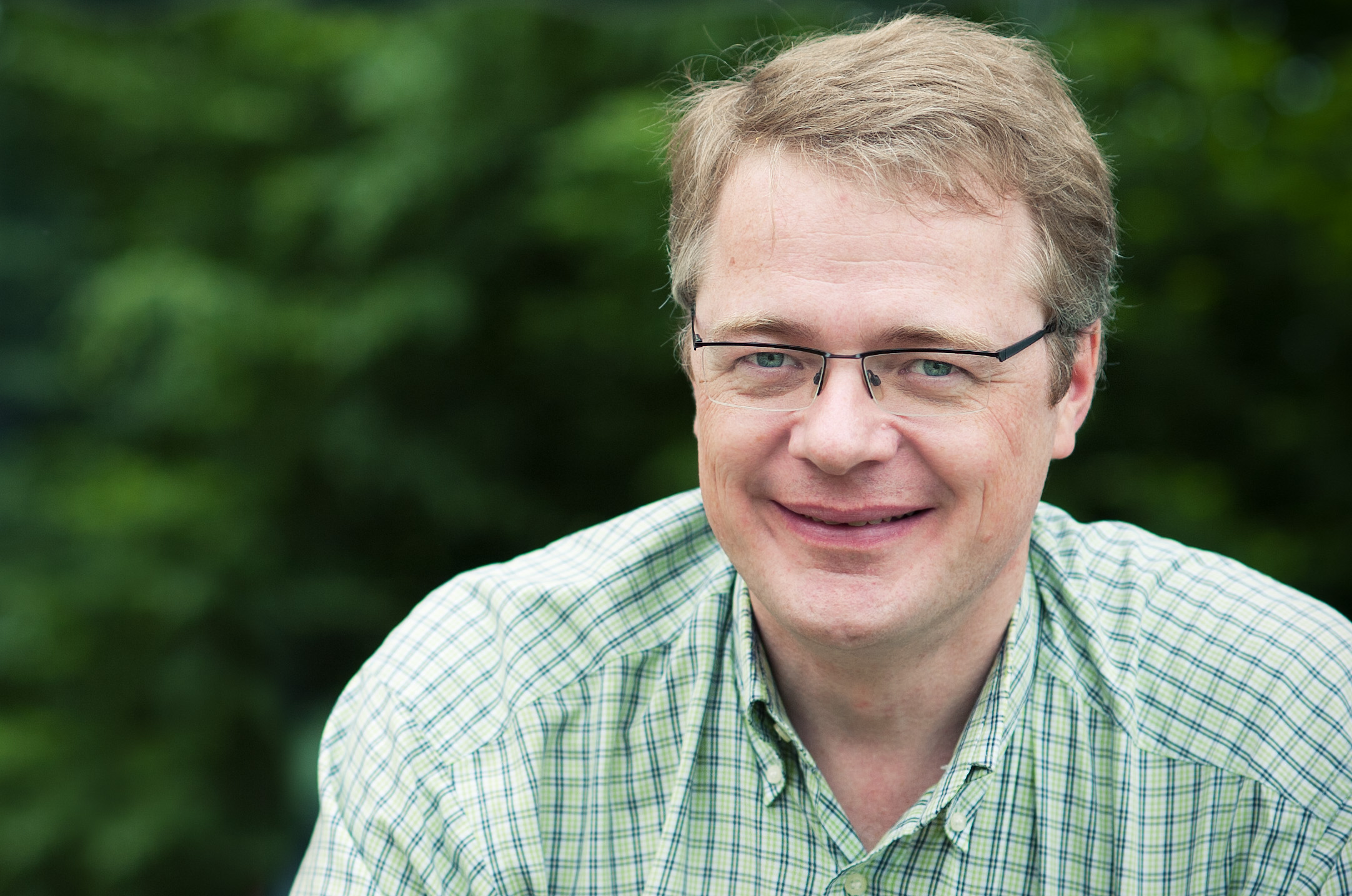
Lutz Feld, 2012

Lutz Feld (born 25 July 1967 in Eitorf, Germany) is a German physicist at RWTH Aachen University.

Having studied physics in Bonn, Germany, Prof Lutz Feld wrote his Dissertation at Deutsches Elektronen-Synchrotron (German Electrons Synchrotron) in Hamburg, Germany. After being a Fellow at CERN, Geneva, Switzerland he habilitated in Freiburg (Breisgau), Germany. Since 2004, Feld has the title of a professor at RWTH Aachen University with the main research field particle physics.
