= Dieter Möhl =

German physicist

- Born: 1936
- Died: 2012/05/24
- Citizenship: Germany

Dieter Möhl (1936 — May 24, 2012) was a German accelerator physicist. Möhl worked at CERN and contributed substantially to the antiproton programme, the Initial Cooling Experiment (ICE) and was a member of the team which initiated and designed the Low Energy Antiproton Ring (LEAR). The Dieter Möhl Medal and the Dieter Möhl Award are sponsored by CERN as a memorial to him.
