= Elisabeth Bauser =

German physicist (1934–1996)

Elisabeth Bauser (née Grobe; 19 April 1934 – 29 September 1996) was a German physicist and crystal researcher. She was internationally renowned as a breeder of extremely pure semiconductor crystals. The gallium arsenide and silicon layers she created were characterized by sharp spectra and high mobility.

== Life ==
Bauser was born in Stuttgart. Her parents were the head teacher Rudolf Grobe and his wife Emma Grobe, née Sommer. Elisabeth Grobe attended the Goethe-Oberschule in Ludwigsburg and graduated from high school in 1954. From 1954 to 1962, she studied physics at the Technical University of Stuttgart, obtaining her Diplom (a German degree similar to a Masters) in 1962.

From 1962 to 1966, Grobe worked as a research assistant at the Institute for Theoretical and Applied Physics at the Technical University of Stuttgart. During this time, she researched current noise in silicon monocrystals. She received her doctorate on this topic in 1968 at the chair of Hermann Haken. Her doctoral supervisor was Karl Seiler.

From September 1966 to 1971, she worked at the Research Institute of the Central Telecommunications Office of the German Federal Post Office in Darmstadt, where she developed her special field of expertise, the liquid phase epitaxy of semiconductors. In 1971, she was hired by the Max Planck Institute for Solid State Research in Stuttgart to research the fundamentals and application of crystal growth, and became the first woman to obtain tenure at the Institute

In the 1970s and 1980s, researchers were working on producing highly efficient thin-film cells. This required a manufacturing process that could produce thin silicon layers of high electronic quality without any volume defects. Elisabeth Bauser was exceptionally successful in growing semiconductor crystals using liquid phase epitaxy. She deposited crystal layers from a slowly cooling solution so that the crystals grew close to thermodynamic equilibrium (i.e. at low supersaturation and relatively low temperatures). The materials produced by Bauser and her team were not only suitable for solar cells, but also for the production of three-dimensional transistor structures. In 1986, IBM Europe honored Bauser with a prize in recognition of her significant contributions to the advancement of material science.

Bauser died on 29 September 1996 after a serious illness.

== Awards and honors ==
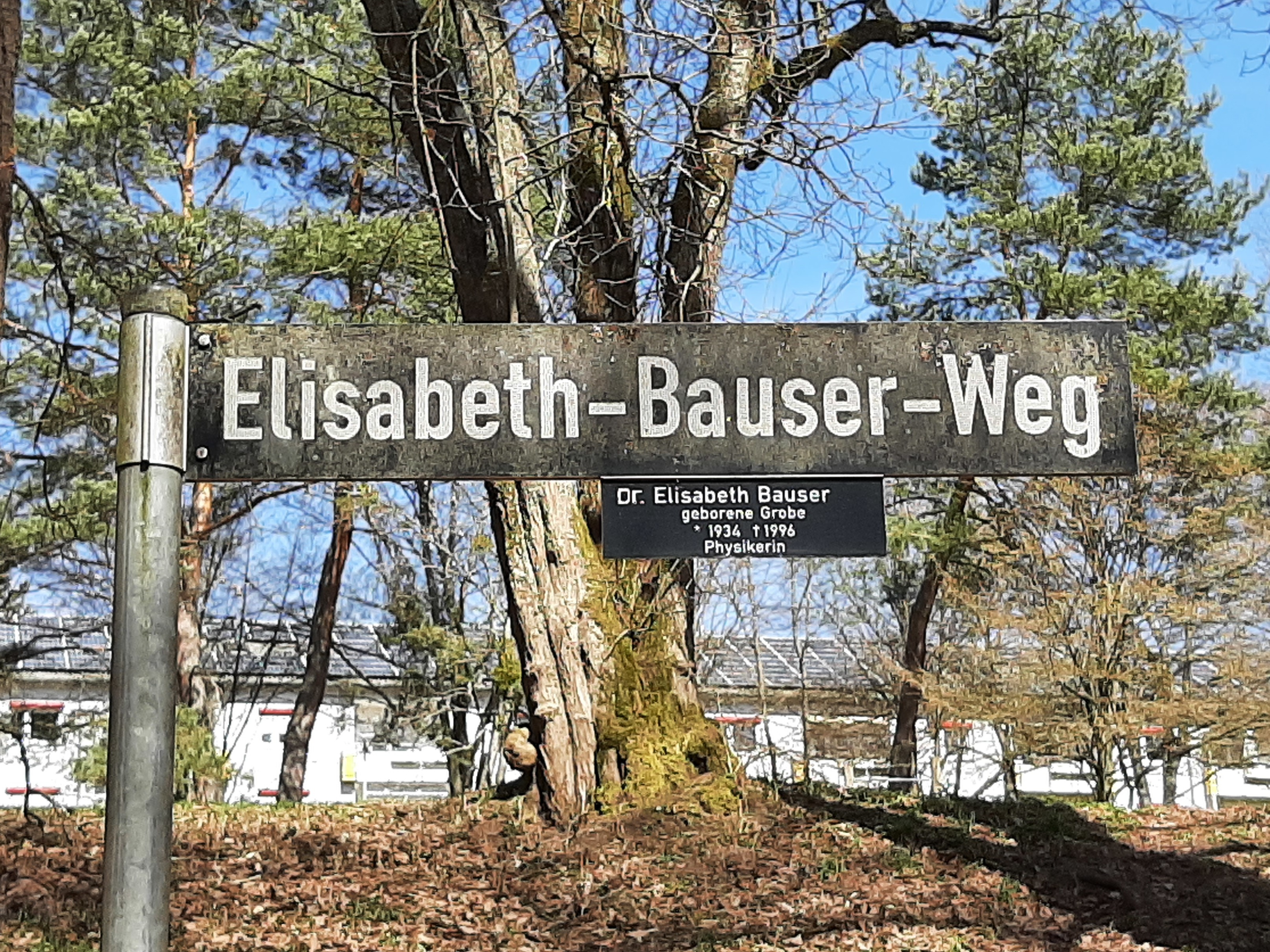
Elisabeth-Bauser-Weg (Elisabeth Bauser Street) in Stuttgart

- 1986 Prize of the Deutsche Gesellschaft für Kristallwachstum und Kristallzüchtung for her work in the field of crystal growth and her contributions to the explanation of the growth mechanisms of semiconductor layers in liquid phase epitaxy, endowed with 3,000 DM
- 1986 Prize for Science and Technology of IBM Europe, endowed with 100,000 ECU, together with Manijeh Razeghi from the Laboratoire Central de Recherches Thomson-CSF-France Paris and Bruce A. Joyce from Philips Research Laboratories Redhill, Surrey
- 1997 A street near the Max Planck Institute for Solid State Research in Stuttgart-Büsnau was named Elisabeth-Bauser-Weg in her honor.
- The Max Planck Institute for Solid State Research honors her memory with the annual Elisabeth Bauser Postdoctoral Fellowship for early-career female researchers.
