= Achim Schwenk =

German physicist

- Education: Stony Brook University
- Scientific career
- Fields: Nuclear physics
- Workplaces: Technische Universität Darmstadt

Achim Schwenk is a German physicist. He became a professor at the Institute of Nuclear Physics at the Darmstadt University of Technology in 2009.

== Professional Activities ==
- since 2011: Editor in Chief, Journal of Physics G: Nuclear and Particle Physics
- 2010-2013: Editorial Board, European Journal of Physics A: Hadrons and Nuclei

== Honors ==
- 2010: ARCHES Prize, BMBF and Minerva Foundation
- 2011: Athene Teaching Award, TU Darmstadt
- 2012: ERC Starting Grant
- 2012: Fellow of the American Physical Society
- 2013: Zdzislaw Szymanski Prize
