= Uwe Thumm =

Uwe Paul Erich Thumm is a German-American physicist with research interests in atomic, molecular, and optical physics and nanoscience. A distinguished physics professor at Kansas State University and the J. R. Macdonald Laboratory in Manhattan, Kansas his research team investigates the ultrafast dynamics of electrons and molecular fragments in laser-matter and particle-matter interactions, highly-charged-ion physics, electron–atom collisions, and plasmonic nanostructures. He is a Fellow of the American Physical Society and recipient of several awards, including the Senior Research Award of the Alexander von Humboldt Foundation.

== Education ==
Born and raised in Freiburg, Germany, Thumm studied physics and mathematics at the University of Freiburg, the University of Heidelberg, and the Université Pierre et Marie Curie (Paris 6) in Paris, France. He completed his diploma thesis on "Projectile excitation in asymmetric ion-atom collisions" and his PhD thesis on "Charge-exchange mechanisms in ion-surface collisions'' at the University of Freiburg under the supervision of John S. Briggs. During his graduate work Thumm spent seven months as a research associate at Oak Ridge National Laboratory and the University of Knoxville in Tennessee, USA. After earning his PhD in 1989, he researched electron-atom collisions and the electronic structure of negative alkali ions at the Joint Institute for Laboratory Astrophysics in Boulder, CO, USA as a postdoctoral research associate before joining the physics faculty at Kansas State University.

== Work ==
Thumm's research focuses on numerical modeling interactions of intense pulses of laser light and of particle beams with atoms, small molecules, clusters, nanoparticles, surfaces, and thin films. He has written and co-authored more than 120 publications in peer-reviewed journals, three patents, and more than 350 non-refereed publications, abstracts, and press releases. His research has contributed to different areas of physics with noteworthy broader impacts, including:

- Light–matter interactions: work on laser-induced and laser-probed nuclear dynamics in molecules; coherent control; electronic dynamics in atoms, surfaces, and plasmonic nanostructures; high-harmonic generation). Broader impacts: solar energy conversion, photo-catalysis, novel light sources, intense light pulse characterization.
- Highly-charged ion physics. Broader impacts: ion-lithography, controlled thermonuclear fusion, particle detection.
- Particle and light interactions with plasmonic nanostructures (electron transfer and emission). Broader impacts: surface chemistry, catalysis, functional nanostructures, novel electro-optical switches & detectors.
- Electron–atom interactions (electronic excitation, highly correlated systems, negative ions). Broader impacts: thermionic energy conversion, improved light sources, basic atomic data, particle detection.

Outside academia, Thumm worked as a consultant for thermionic energy conversion at Razor Associates in Sunnyvale, CA and Research Director at Advanced Photonics Technologies AG in Bruckmühl, Germany.

== Honors ==
- 2023 Olin K. Petefish - Takeru Higuchi Award of the University of Kansas Endowment Association, “for outstanding research achievements”
- 1992–present: competitive research awards as single and collaborative principal investigator from various funding agencies (DFG, NSF, DOE, DOD, Humboldt Foundation, Max-Planck Foundation, Harvard-Smithsonian Institution)
- 2022 Visiting professor research awards at the Max-Planck Institute for Nuclear Physics in Heidelberg, Germany and ETH Zürich, Switzerland
- 2008, 2014, and 2020 Kansas State University Professorial Award for "outstanding contributions to the department, college, and university"
- 2014 Alexander von Humboldt Senior Research Award honoring "the academic and research achievements of the award winner's lifetime".
- 2014 Distinguished Graduate Faculty Award at Kansas State University.
- 2013 Elected fellow of the Swiss National Center of Competence in Research
- 2011 Elected fellow of the American Physical Society
- 2007 Max-Planck Society research award
- 2000 Mercator visiting professor award of the German Research Foundation (DFG)
- 1999 Harvard University research award
- 1981–1982 German Academic Exchange Service (DAAD) scholarship
