= Ulrich Mescheder =

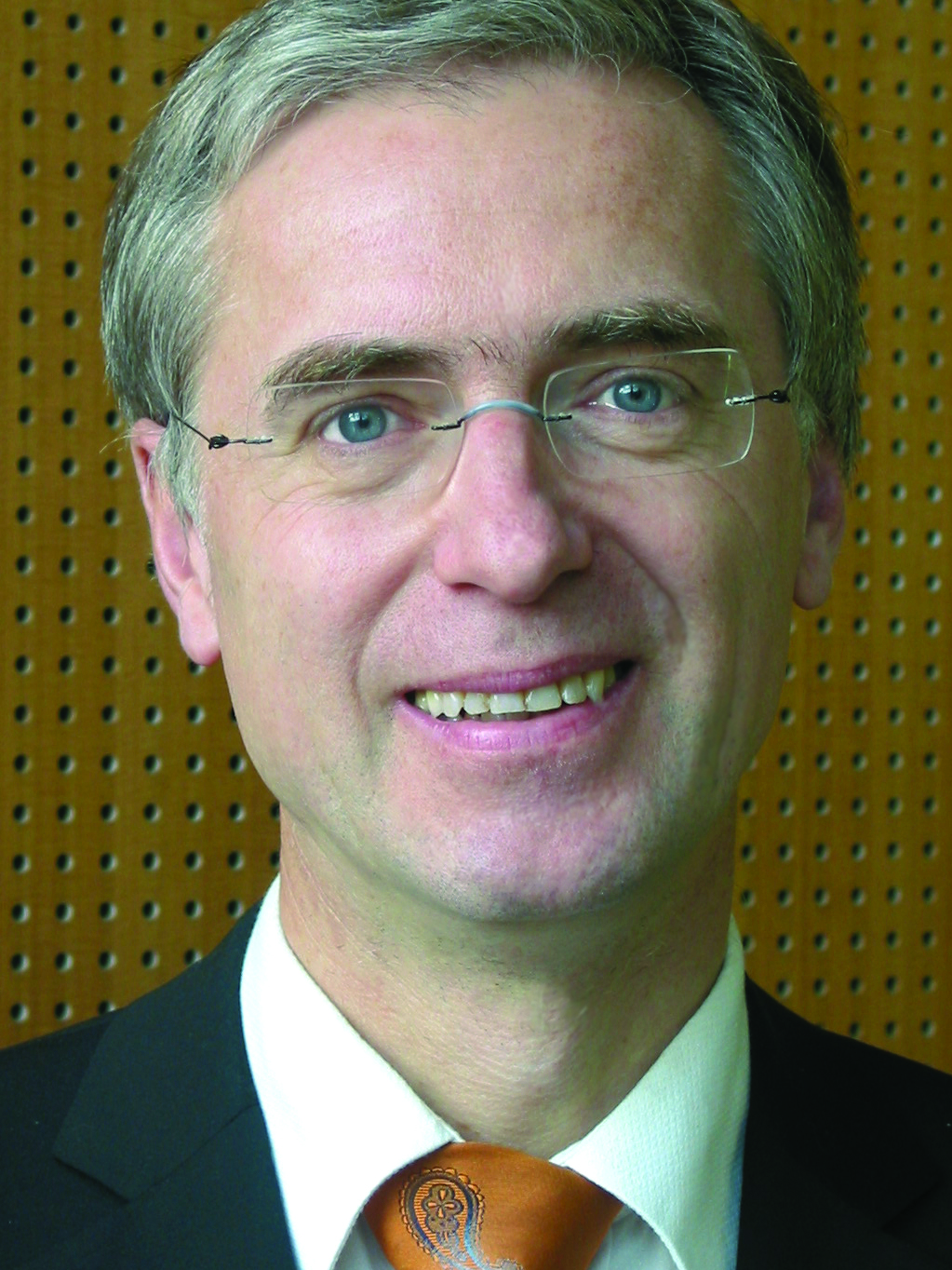
Ulrich Mescheder

Ulrich Mescheder is a German professor and university administrator. He heads the Central Research Institute and the Technology Laboratory for Micro- and Nanosystems and is vice president for Research at Furtwangen University of Applied Sciences. His research specializations are microsystems technology and nanotechnology.

Mescheder studied physics at the Universities of Bielefeld and Marburg, completing his doctorate in 1985. He has been on the faculty at Furtwangen University since 1991; he previously worked as a research associate at the Philips Research Laboratories in Hamburg in materials science with a focus on thin-film technology applications and was part of a team researching new methods of submicrometer structuring at BESSY in Berlin.

He has written more than 100 scientific publications as well as the textbook Mikrosystemtechnik; Konzepte und Anwendungen. At Furtwangen, he manages the Central Research Institute and the Technology Laboratory for Micro- and Nanosystems and is also Vice President for Research.

Mescheder has also served on the city council of Furtwangen.
