= Horst Wenninger =

German physicist (1938–2020)

Horst Artur Wenninger (1938 - † 16 July 2020) was a German physicist who spent most of his career at CERN, later for the FAIR project.

== Life ==
Horst Wenninger earned his doctorate in nuclear physics at Heidelberg University in 1965.

=== Career at CERN ===
Wenninger spent 35 years at the European Organization for Nuclear Research (CERN) starting as a participant to the Bubble Chamber experiments in the 1960s, a period of time that he was also assisting work at the Institute of High Energy Physics of the University of Heidelberg.

In 1968 he joined the BEBC project and worked on bubble chamber physics until 1984 when the project was eventually terminated. During these 20 years in the BEBC team, Wenninger successfully undertook key roles such as the BEBC coordinator and BEBC group leader.

In 1984 he became Leader of the Experimental Physics Facilities (EF) Division and 6 years later Leader of the new Accelerator Technologies (AT) Division, both in CERN.

Wenninger's enthusiasm for physics positioned him in the core of the Large Hadron Collider (LHC) project preparations in 1993, acting as the Deputy Project Leader. He was there when the project got approved by the CERN Council in 1996 for the contribution to which Wenninger was then appointed Research-Technical Director.

He retired from CERN in September 2003.

=== Working for the FAIR project ===
From 2005 onwards, he served as chair in a large variety of FAIR committees. Starting with the Working Group on Science and Technical Issues he later set up and was long time chair of the In-Kind Review Board (IKRB) of FAIR. He was FAIR's link and key person for administrating and funding issues and part of the Machine Advisory Committee and the International Steering Committee. He was FAIR's Joint Core Team leader after Hans Gutbrod from 2008 onwards until Boris Sharkov started to act as FAIR Scientific Director. He was mainly involved on the reworking to set FAIR's Modularized Start Version until the official inauguration of FAIR in December 4, 2010. He continued as IKRB committee head until 2019.

=== Last years ===
During his last years of career he also took active part in the TESLA collaboration, which was merged into the International Linear Collider project. In 2011 at the international symposium on subnuclear physics held in Vatican City, he gave a talk The LAA Project and the Consequences on LHC.

Wenninger was a member of many scientific boards.

Horst Wenninger died on 16 July 2020.

== Books ==
- Wiik, Bjørn H.; Wagner, Albrecht; Wenninger, Horst, eds. (2002). From the preshower to the new technologies for supercolliders : in honour of Antonino Zichichi. River Edge, N.J.: World Scientific. ISBN 9812381996. (See Antonino Zichichi.)
- Fabjan, Christian; Taylor, Thomas; Treille, Daniel; Wenninger, Horst, eds. (2017). Technology meets research — 60 years of CERN technology : selected highlights. New Jersey: World Scientific. ISBN 978-9814749138; with members of the Editorial Group, C. Benvenuti, G. Brian, K. Hübner, P. G. Innocenti, P. Lebrun, R. Perin and C. Sutton and with important contributions from many other CERN experts

== See also ==
- CERN
