= Ernst Helmut Brandt =

German physicist

- Born: Ernst Helmut Brandt; 17 September 1941; Berlin-Kaulsdorf, Germany
- Died: 1 September 2011 (aged 69); Stuttgart, Germany
- Known for: Vortex physics Geometric barrier
- Scientific career
- Fields: Physics
- Workplaces: Max Planck Institute Stuttgart

Ernst Helmut Brandt (17 September 1941 – 1 September 2011) was a German theoretical physicist. He is best known for working on the Abrikosov vortex lattice in type-II superconductors, particularly with the ideal lattice, its nonlocal elastic response, lattice defects, pinning and geometrical effects in the electromagnetic response of superconductors.

He was born in Berlin-Kaulsdorf, the second son of the publisher and bookseller Helmut Brandt and Elise Brandt (née Stümpfle). He studied physics at the University of Stuttgart and Technische Universität Berlin and the Free University of Berlin between October 1961 to June 1967. He worked on his doctoral thesis under Professor Alfred Seeger at the Max Planck Institute for Metals Research and the University of Stuttgart between 1967 and 1969. From December 1969 to October 1970, he was a visiting scientist at the Lomonosov University in Moscow. In 1970, he was given a permanent position as researcher at the Max Planck Institute for Metals Research, Institute of Physics in Stuttgart, where he stayed until his retirement. He continued to travel and write publications after his retirement.

He specialised in the theory of vortices in type-II superconductors. During his career he had over 330 publicationswith over 11,000 citations.

He died on 1 September 2011 at his home, from inoperable pancreatic cancer.

== Personal life ==
In 1970 he married Renate Sprandl. They had three children, Gerhard (born 1976), Ursula (born 1979), and Martin (born 1983).
