= Eckehard Specht =

- Born: April 20, 1952 (age 74); Gelsenkirchen, North Rhine-Westphalia, Germany
- Occupation: Professor
- Years active: 1992 - present
- Spouse: Dr. Brigitte Eschler

Eckehard Specht is a professor in Otto von Guericke University, Magdeburg, Germany. He belongs to Institute of Fluid Dynamics and Thermodynamics (ISUT) department. His specializations are Combustion technology, heat and mass transfer, chemical process engineering, global warming, and ceramic materials.

He has obtained his PhD in Heat transfer from TU Clausthal. After that, he did the habilitation in the same university. He moved to OVG university, Magdeburg.

== Background ==
Prof. Dr.-Ing. Eckehard Specht studied Chemical Engineering at the Technical University of Clausthal and was then Scientific Research Fellow at the Institute for Energy Engineering at the TU Clausthal (1977–1993). After his Ph.D. about the coal combustion (1984) and Habilitation in the field of high temperature process equipment (1993), he is professor from October 1, 1993, for thermodynamics and combustion at the Otto von Guericke University Magdeburg, Institute of Fluid Dynamics and Thermodynamics.

He is an appointed member of nine committees, including, the research community industrial furnaces of the Association of German Engineering Federation (VDMA), the Technical Commission of the German Ceramic Thermal Engineering Society (DKG) and the Committee of thermal processing technology by the German Iron and Steel Institute (VDEH). During his university career he was involved with a member of the Senate and Council of TU Clausthal (1983–1988), a member of the Senate of the University of Magdeburg (1994–2000) and since 1994 he is the Dean of teaching for the Faculty of Process and Systems Engineering of the Otto von Guericke University of Magdeburg.

On 14 March 2003 he was awarded the Ludwig Mond Prize from the Institution of Mechanical Engineers, England.

== Research Interest ==
Intensive cooling of metals

- Simulation of microstructure, stress, hardness and delay in the cooling of steel bodies of complex geometry
- Determination of heat transfer conditions for low-distortion cooling
- Measurement of local heat transfer coefficients for water sprays and air flow panels using infrared technology

Dynamic simulation of heat treatment processes in industrial furnaces, for example,

- Heat transfer and reaction paths in shaft
- Influence of the transport rollers and cross-sectional dimensions on the temperature more uniform in roller kilns
- Influencing the bed motion and heat transfer in rotary kilns

Optimization of combustion chambers

- Simulation of flow, concentration and temperature fields with combustion reaction

Measurement of thermophysical material properties to 1600 °C

- Thermal Conductivity
- Specific heat capacity
- Density and thermal expansion

== Nominated Member of the Industrial Associations ==
- Research Association Industrial Furnaces (VDMA)
- Society of Chemical Process Engineering (ProcessNet):
- Working party of High Temperature Process Engineering
- Working party of Heat and Mass Transfer
- Scientific member and reviewer of German Industrial Research Foundation (AiF)
- Heat Technique Committee of the German Ceramics Society (DKG)
- Industrial Furnace Committee of the German Union of Ferrous Metallurgy (VdEh)
- Committee Continuous Casting of the German Society of Materials Science (DGM)
- Working Party Climate Change of the Federal State Saxony-Anhalt

== PhD & Post Doc. Guidance ==
He consistently maintains more than 15 PhD students. More than 20 students finished their research study successfully. In general, he likes to work with foreign students.
