= Klaus Riedle =

German power engineering scientist (born 1941)

Klaus Riedle (born 12 August 1941, Innsbruck, Nazi Germany) is a German power engineering scientist who has contributed to the development of more efficient gas turbines for power generation. Since 1986, Riedle is an honorary professor at the University of Erlangen-Nuremberg institute of engineering thermodynamics.

== Career ==
Riedle graduated from the Technical University of Munich in 1964. Following two years as visiting assistant professor at Carnegie Mellon University, he joined Siemens in 1971, specializing in nuclear reactor security. In the mid 1980s, Riedle changed his focus to fossil fuel power plants and eventually became president of the Siemens gas turbines division. He retired from that position in 2006. As of 2010, he headed the Siemens scientific developments department for high-temperature turbines. Riedle’s approach to research and development has been described as characterized by patience and ability to divide the improvement of complex systems into separate tasks, while always monitoring the combined effects on performance and reliability.

Since 1986, Riedle is an honorary professor at the University of Erlangen-Nuremberg institute of engineering thermodynamics, where he has been teaching thermodynamics, power transmission and other subjects. He has also, until 2015, served on the governing board of the energy and environment society of the Association of German Engineers.

In 2005, along with the Russian scientist Zhores Alferov, Riedle was awarded the Global Energy Prize for his development of high-temperature gas turbines with improved efficiency and capacity.
