= Johannes Juilfs =

German physicist (1911–1995)

Johannes Wilhelm Heinrich Juilfs, also known by the alias Mathias Jules, (15 December 1911 – 1995) was a German theoretical and experimental physicist. He was a member of the Sturmabteilung (SA) and then, in 1933, of the Schutzstaffel (SS). Prior to World War II, he was one of three SS staff physicists who investigated the physicist Werner Heisenberg during the Heisenberg Affair, instigated, in part, by the ideological Deutsche Physik (German physics) movement. During the war, he worked as a theoretical physics assistant at the Kaiser Wilhelm Institute for Physics. During the denazification process after World War II, he was banned from working as a civil servant in academia. For a few years, he worked as a school principal, and then he took a job as a physicist in the textile industry. With the help of Heisenberg and the Minister of Lower Saxony, he was able to become a full professor at the Leibniz University Hannover.

== Education ==
Juilfs conducted his university studies from 1930 to 1938. He was a student of Werner Kolhörster and Max von Laue. He received his doctorate in mathematical physics under Kolhörster, in 1938, from the Friedrich Wilhelm University of Berlin. He completed his Habilitation there on 30 March 1945.

== Career ==
=== World War II ===
Juilfs was a theoretical physics assistant from 1938 to 1945 at the Kaiser-Wilhelm Institut für Physik (KWIP, Kaiser Wilhelm Institute for Physics; today, the Max-Planck Institut für Physik), first for Max von Laue and from 1943 to Werner Heisenberg.

Juilfs was first a member of the Sturmabteilung (SA, Storm Detachments) and then, in 1933, of the Schutz-Staffel (SS, Defense Squadron). He was also a leader in the Nationalsozialistischer Deutscher Studentenbund (NSDStB, National Socialist German Student League). In the SS, he rose to the rank of Obersturmführer.

=== The deutsche Physik movement & the Heisenberg Affair ===
On 1 April 1935 Arnold Sommerfeld, Heisenberg’s teacher and doctoral advisor at the Ludwig-Maximilians-Universität München, achieved emeritus status. However, Sommerfeld stayed on as his own temporary replacement during the selection process for his successor, which took until 1 December 1939. The process was lengthy due to academic and political differences between the Munich Faculty’s selection and that of both the Reichserziehungsministerium (REM, Reich Education Ministry) and the supporters of deutsche Physik, which was antisemitic and had a bias against theoretical physics, especially including quantum mechanics and the theory of relativity.

In 1935, the Munich Faculty drew up a candidate list to replace Sommerfeld as ordinarius professor of theoretical physics and head of the Institute for Theoretical Physics at the Ludwig-Maximilians-Universität München. There were three names on the list: Werner Heisenberg, who received the Nobel Prize in Physics in 1932, Peter Debye, who would receive the Nobel Prize in Chemistry in 1936, and Richard Becker - all former students of Sommerfeld. The Munich Faculty was firmly behind these candidates, with Heisenberg as their first choice. However, supporters of deutsche Physik and elements in the REM had their own list of candidates and the battle commenced, dragging on for over four years. During this time, Heisenberg came under vicious attack by the supporters of deutsche Physik.

One such attack was published in Das Schwarze Korps, the newspaper of the Schutzstaffel, or SS, headed by Heinrich Himmler. In the editorial, Heisenberg was called a “White Jew” who should be made to “disappear.” These verbal attacks were taken seriously, as there was physical violence against the Jews and they were incarcerated. Heisenberg fought back with an editorial and a letter to Himmler, in an attempt to get a resolution to this matter and regain his honor.

At one point, Heisenberg’s mother visited Himmler’s mother to help bring a resolution to the affair. The two women knew each other as a result of Heisenberg’s maternal grandfather and Himmler’s father being rectors and members of a Bavarian hiking club. Eventually, Himmler settled the Heisenberg affair by sending two letters, one to SS-Gruppenführer Reinhard Heydrich and one to Heisenberg, both on 21 July 1938. In the letter to Heydrich, Himmler said Germany could not afford to lose or silence Heisenberg as he would be useful for teaching a generation of scientists. To Heisenberg, Himmler said the letter came on recommendation of his family and he cautioned Heisenberg to make a distinction between professional physics research results and the personal and political attitudes of the involved scientists. The letter to Heisenberg was signed under the closing “Mit freundlichem Gruss und, Heil Hitler!” (With friendly greetings, Heil Hitler!”)

Overall, the Heisenberg affair was settled with a victory for academic standards and professionalism, however, with Wilhelm Müller taking over for Sommerfeld on 1 December 1939, this appointment was a political victory over academic standards. Müller was not a theoretical physicist, had not published in a physics journal, and was not a member of the Deutsche Physikalische Gesellschaft; his appointment as a replacement for Sommerfeld was considered a travesty and detrimental to educating a new generation of theoretical physicists.

During the SS investigation of Heisenberg, there were three investigators and all had training in physics. Heisenberg had participated in the doctoral examination of one of them at Leipzig University. The most influential of the three, however, was Juilfs. During their investigation, they had all become supporters of Heisenberg as well as his position against the ideological policies of the deutsche Physik movement in theoretical physics and academia.

=== Afterwards ===
It was in the summer of 1940 that Wolfgang Finkelnburg became an acting director of the Nationalsozialistischer Deutscher Dozentenbund (NSDDB, National Socialist German University Lecturers League) at the Technische Hochschule Darmstadt. As such, he organized the Münchner Religionsgespräche (“Munich Synod”), which took place on November 15, 1940. The event was an offensive against the deutsche Physik movement. Finkelnburg invited five representatives to make arguments for theoretical physics and academic decisions based on ability, rather than politics: Carl Friedrich von Weizsäcker, Otto Scherzer, Georg Joos, Otto Heckmann, and Hans Kopfermann. Alfons Bühl, a supporter of deutsche Physik, invited Harald Volkmann, Bruno Thüring, Wilhelm Müller, Rudolf Tomaschek, and Ludwig Wesch. The discussion was led by Gustav Borer, with Herbert Stuart and Johannes Malsch as observers. While the technical outcome of the event may have been thin, it was a political victory against deutsche Physik and signaled the decline of the influence of the movement within the German Reich.

In November 1942, as a follow-on to the 1940 Münchner Religionsgespräche, 30 scientists met at Seefeld in the Austrian Tyrol to establish guidelines for the teaching of physics. Among those in attendance were Werner Heisenberg, Carl Ramsauer, Wolfgang Finkelnburg, Carl Friedrich von Weizsäcker, Juilfs, as well as supporters of the declining deutsche Physik movement. Juilfs clearly expressed the side the SS had taken against the movement. The deutsche Physik supporters were sufficiently cowed and the program of the 1940 Münchner Religionsgespräche was adopted, i.e., quantum mechanics and the theory of relativity were accepted as essential parts of German physics. This was a considerable victory by the physics establishment in Germany, as the state was forced to back down on ideological purity in the teaching of physics in order to get the physics community’s support.

== Post World War II ==
The denazification process in Germany after World War II barred Juilfs from returning to a university career. From 1948 he was a principal at an adult education school in Helmstedt. However, with the founding of the Bundesrepublik Deutschland (Federal Republic of Germany) in 1949, and with the help of some influential individuals, the fortunes of Juilfs began to change. It was in 1950 that he became head of the physics department at the Textilforschungsanstalt (Textile Research Institute) at Krefeld. The Minister of Culture of the German state of Lower Saxony intervened on his behalf with a grant. Shortly thereafter, Juilfs coauthored a textbook, Physik der Gegenwart, with Carl Friedrich von Weizsäcker, which was published in 1952 and contributed to his rehabilitation in academia. For Juilfs supporting Heisenberg during the Heisenberg Affair, the quid pro quo from Heisenberg was a whitewash certificate; these certificates were known as Persilschein, a word play on the detergent Persil. The Minister of Lower Saxony intervened again and helped Juilfs obtain a temporary position as lecturer on theoretical physics at the Technische Hochschule Hannover. By 1958, he was an ordentlicher Professor (ordinarius professor) there. After World War II, many academicians lost their jobs through the denazification process, but by or shortly after the formation of the new Federal Republic of Germany, most of them were again found in academic positions.

== Selected Literature by Juilfs ==
- Johannes Juilfs and Viktor Masuch Die Ionisierung durch Gamma- und Höhenstrahlen in verschiedenen Gasen, Zeitschrift für Physik Volume 104, Numbers 5–6, pp. 458–467 (1937). The authors were identified as being in Berlin-Dahlem. The article was received on 26 November 1936. The authors thanked Professor Doctor Werner Kolhörster.
- Johannes Juilfs (Mar 1939). "Das erste deutsche Mathematikerlager". Deutsche Mathematik. 3 (1): 109–140.

== Books by Juilfs ==
- Carl Friedrich von Weizsäcker and Johannes Juilfs Physik der Gegenwart (Athenäum-Verl., 1952, 1958)
- Johannes Juilfs Die Messung von Gewebetemperaturen mittels Temperaturstrahlung (Westdt. Verl., 1955)
- Johannes Juilfs Vergleichende Untersuchungen zur elastischen und bleibenden Dehnung von Fasern (Westdt. Verl., 1956)
- Johannes Juilfs Zur Messung der Fadenglätte (Westdt. Verl., 1956)
- Johannes Juilfs Zur Dichtebestimmung von Fasern (Westdt. Verl., 1957)
- Johannes Juilfs Die Bestimmung des Wasserrückhaltevermögens (bzw. des Quellwertes) von Fasern (Westdt. Verl., 1958)
- Wilhelm Weltzien, Johannes Juilfs, and Werner Bubser Die Textilforschungsanstalt Krefeld 1920 – 1958 (Westdt. Verl., 1958)
- Johannes Juilfs Vergleichende Untersuchungen am Schopper-Scheuerprüfgerät (Westdt. Verl., 1958)
- Johannes Juilfs Zur Bestimmung der Bruchlast (Zugfestigkeit) von Fasern, Fäden und Garnen (Westdt. Verl., 1959)
- Johannes Juilfs Zur Bestimmung der Absolutdichte von Fasern (Westdt. Verl., 1960)

== Bibliography ==
- Beyerchen, Alan D. Scientists Under Hitler: Politics and the Physics Community in the Third Reich (Yale, 1977) ISBN 0-300-01830-4
- David C. Cassidy, "Uncertainty: The Life and Science of Werner Heisenberg", (W. H. Freeman, 1992)
- Hentschel, Klaus (editor) and Ann M. Hentschel (editorial assistant and translator) Physics and National Socialism: An Anthology of Primary Sources (Birkhäuser, 1996) ISBN 0-8176-5312-0
- Rose, Paul Laurence "Heisenberg and the Nazi Atomic Bomb Project: A Study in German Culture" (University of California, 1998)
- Thomas Powers. Heisenberg's War: The Secret History of the German Bomb (Knopf, 1993)
- Walker, Mark German National Socialism and the Quest for Nuclear Power 1939–1949 (Cambridge, 1993) ISBN 0-521-43804-7
