= Herbert Arthur Stuart =

German physicist

Herbert Arthur Stuart (27 March 1899, Zurich – 8 April 1974, Hanover) was a German experimental physicist who made contributions in molecular physics research. During World War II, he was director of the experimental physics department at the Technische Hochschule Dresden. From 1955, he was the head of the high polymer physics laboratory at the University of Mainz.

== Education ==
From 1920 to 1925, Stuart studied at the University of Würzburg and the University of Göttingen. In 1925, he was awarded his doctorate under James Franck at the University of Göttingen; his thesis was on resonance fluorescence of mercury vapor. He then went to work and study with Otto Stern, director of the "Institut für physikalische Chemie" (Institute for Physical Chemistry) at the Universität Hamburg and then with Richard Gans, director of the II. Physikalische Institut (Second Physics Institute) at the Albertus-Universität Königsberg (today, the Immanuel Kant State University of Russia). He completed his Habilitation in 1928, with an Habilitationsschrift on the temperature dependency of dielectric constants in gases and vapors.

== Career ==
From 1928, Stuart was a Privatdozent and he did research on the Kerr effect and light scattering. In 1930, he was Rockefeller Foundation Fellow at the University of California, Berkeley, specializing in molecular structure research. From 1935, he was an untenured ausserordentlicher Professor (extraordinarius professor) and substitute director at the Albertus-Universität Königsberg. From 1936 to 1939, he substituted in the theoretical physics chair at the Friedrich-Wilhelms-Universität (today, the Humboldt-Universität zu Berlin), which had been vacated by Erwin Schrödinger. From 1939 to 1945, he was an ordentlicher Professor (ordinarius professor) and director of the experimental physics department at the Technische Hochschule Dresden (today, the Technische Universität Dresden). At Dresden, he began studying the viscosity and both light and electron scattering of macromolecules.

The Law for the Restoration of the Professional Civil Service, passed in 1933, was substantially directed at academia and judges. The Deutsche Physikalische Gesellschaft (DPG, German Physical Society) dragged its feet in the dismissal of Jews for more than five years. It was not until the end of 1938, on the initiation of a petition by Herbert Arthur Stuart and Wilhelm Orthmann, who were engaged in physics studies (academic) reform, that the DPG asked Jewish members to withdraw their membership.

In 1940, Stuart attended the historic meeting known as the Münchner Religionsgespräche confronting the deutsche Phsyik movement; while an avid supporter of the National Socialist party line, Stuart was neutral during the dispute. When Adolf Hitler became Chancellor of Germany on 30 January 1933, the concept of deutsche Physik took on more favor and fervor. Deutsche Physik was anti-Semitic and anti-theoretical physics, especially including modern physics, i.e., quantum mechanics. As applied in the university environment, political factors took priority over the historically applied concept of scholarly ability, even though its two most prominent supporters were Nobel Laureates Philipp Lenard and Johannes Stark. During the period in which deutsche Physik was gaining prominence, a foremost concern of the great majority of scientists was to maintain autonomy against political encroachment. Some of the more established scientists, such as Max von Laue, could demonstrate more autonomy than the younger and less established scientists. This was, in part, due to political organizations, such as the Nationalsozialistischer Deutscher Dozentenbund (NSDDB, National Socialist German University Lecturers League), whose district leaders had a decisive role in the acceptance of an Habilitationsschrift, which was a prerequisite to attaining the rank of Privatdozent necessary to becoming a university lecturer. While some with ability joined such organizations out of tactical career considerations, others with ability and adherence to historical academic standards joined these organizations to moderate their activities. This was the case of Wolfgang Finkelnburg. It was in the summer of 1940 that Finkelnburg became an acting director of the NSDDB at Technische Hochschule Darmstadt. As such, he organized the Münchner Religionsgespräche, which took place on 15 November 1940 and was known as the “Munich Synod.” The Münchner Religionsgespräche was an offensive against deutsche Physik. Finkelnburg invited five representatives to make arguments for theoretical physics and academic decisions based on ability rather than politics: Carl Friedrich von Weizsäcker, Otto Scherzer, Georg Joos, Otto Heckmann, and Hans Kopfermann. Alfons Bühl, a supporter of deutsche Physik, invited Harald Volkmann, Bruno Thüring, Wilhelm Müller, Rudolf Tomaschek, and Ludwig Wesch. The discussion was led by Gustav Borer, with Herbert Arthur Stuart and Johannes Malsch as observers. While the technical outcome may have been thin, it was a political victory against deutsche Physik.

From 1948 to 1955, Stuart was a physics adviser to the Bayer Company in Leverkusen. From 1955, he was an ausserordentlicher Professor of chemical physics and head of the high polymer physics laboratory at the Johannes Gutenberg-Universität Mainz.

== Literature by Stuart ==
- H. A. Stuart Über den Temperaturverlauf der Dielektrizitätskonstanten einiger Gase bei verschiedenen Drucken, Bemerkung zu der gleichnamigen Arbeit von Magdalene Forró, Zeitschrift für Physik Volume 48, Issue 9-10, p. 747 (1928)
- H. A. Stuart Über den Kerreffekt an Gasen und Dämfen. I. Methode und Ergebnisse für SO_{2}, CH_{3}Cl, CH_{3}Br, C_{2}H_{5}Cl und (CH_{3})_{2}O, Zeitschrift für Physik Volume 59, p. 13 (1929)
- H. A. Stuart and H. Volkmann Experimentelle Untersuchungen des elektrischen Kerreffekts an Gasen und Dämpfen bei höheren Temperaturen, Annalen der Physik Volume 410, Issue 2, pp. 121–149 (1933)
- Herbert Arthur Stuart Bedeutung der Physik und Aufgaben des Physikers, Deutsche Mathematik Volume 4, 116 – 117 (1939), as cited in Hentschel and Hentschel, 1996, p. XC; see Reference [859]. This was Stuart’s report on an initiative to reform physics education presented at the first Mathematikerlager (German mathematics camp) organized by the Nationalsozialistischer Deutscher Dozentenbund (NSDDB, National Socialist German University Lecturers League).
- Herbert Stuart Erforschung der Elektronenhüllen und der Molekülgestalt mit anderen Methoden in Hans Kopfermann (editor) Physics of the electron shells (The American FIAT review of German science, 1939-1945, Volume 12) (Office of Military Government for Germany Field Information Agencies, Technical, 1948) pp. 69 – 91.
