= Hans Kopfermann =

German physicist (1895–1963)

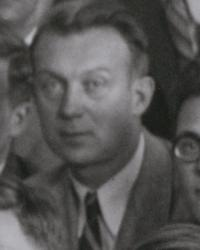
- Hans Kopfermann, 1937
- Born: 26 April 1895; Breckenheim, German Empire
- Died: 26 January 1963 (aged 67); Heidelberg, West Germany
- Education: Friedrich-Alexander-Universität Erlangen-Nürnberg
- Alma mater: Friedrich-Wilhelms-Universität
- Known for: Spectroscopic investigations
- Awards: Election to the Academies of Göttingen, Heidelberg, and Copenhagen
- Scientific career
- Fields: Atomic and nuclear physics
- Thesis: (1925)
- Academic advisors: James Franck

Hans Kopfermann (26 April 1895 in Breckenheim near Wiesbaden – 26 January 1963 in Heidelberg) was a German atomic and nuclear physicist. He devoted his entire career to spectroscopic investigations, and he did pioneering work in measuring nuclear spin. During World War II, he worked on the German nuclear energy project, also known as the Uranprojekt (Uranium Project).

== Education ==
Kopfermann began his studies at the Friedrich-Alexander-Universität Erlangen-Nürnberg and the Friedrich-Wilhelms-Universität (today, the Humboldt-Universität zu Berlin). After World War I, he continued his studies at the Georg-August University of Göttingen under James Franck. He received his doctorate there in 1925.

== Career ==
After receipt of his doctorate, Kopferman went to work with Rudolf Ladenburg, who was a staff scientist at the Kaiser-Wilhelm Institut für physikalische Chemie und Elektrochemie (Kaiser Wilhelm Institute for Physical Chemistry and Electrochemistry; today, the Fritz-Haber-Institut der Max-Planck-Gesellschaft), in Berlin-Dahlem. Kopfermann investigated dispersion and stimulated emission. In 1931, he began the study of the hyperfine structure of spectral lines, which began his pioneering work on measuring nuclear spin.

In 1932, Kopfermann was a Privatdozent at the Friedrich-Wilhelms-Universität, which meant that he had completed his Habilitation. He then spent a year of research under Niels Bohr at the Institute of Theoretical Physics in Copenhagen. From 1933 to 1937, he was a senior assistant to Gustav Hertz at the Technische Hochschule Berlin (today, the Technische Universität Berlin), in Berlin–Charlottenburg.

From 1937, Kopfermann was an ordentlicher Professor (ordinarius professor) at the Christian-Albrechts-Universität zu Kiel. In 1940, the publication of his book on the nuclear moment, Kernmomente, influenced the next generation of nuclear physicists. In 1941, against his will, Kopfermann was named dean of the University by the rector, which pressured Kopfermann into joining the Nationalsozialistische Deutsche Arbeiterpartei (NSDAP, National Socialist Workers Party). He remained at Kiel until 1942.

While at the University of Kiel, Kopfermann was a principal participant in an event organized by Wolfgang Finkelnburg. The event, known as the Münchner Religionsgespräche ("Munich Synod"), signaled the decline of the influence of the deutsche Physik (German physics) movement.

The deutsche Physik movement was anti-Semitic and anti-theoretical physics. As applied in the university environment, political factors took priority over the historically applied concept of scholarly ability, even though its two most prominent supporters were the Nobel Laureates in Physics Philipp Lenard and Johannes Stark. When Adolf Hitler became Chancellor of Germany on 30 January 1933, the concept and movement took on more favor and more fervor. Supporters of deutsche Physik launched vicious attacks against leading theoretical physicists, including Arnold Sommerfeld and Werner Heisenberg.

It was in the summer of 1940 that Finkelnburg became an acting director of the Nationalsozialistischer Deutscher Dozentenbund (NSDDB, National Socialist German University Lecturers League) at the Technische Hochschule Darmstadt (today, the Technische Universität Darmstadt). As such, he organized the Münchner Religionsgespräche, which took place on 15 November 1940. The event was an offensive against the deutsche Physik movement. Finkelnburg invited five representatives to make arguments for theoretical physics and academic decisions based on ability, rather than politics: Carl Friedrich von Weizsäcker, Otto Scherzer, Georg Joos, Otto Heckmann, and Hans Kopfermann. Alfons Bühl, a supporter of deutsche Physik, invited Harald Volkmann, Bruno Thüring, Wilhelm Müller, Rudolf Tomaschek, and Ludwig Wesch. The discussion was led by Gustav Borer, with Herbert Stuart and Johannes Malsch as observers. While the technical outcome of the event may have been thin, it was a political victory against deutsche Physik and signaled the decline of the influence of the movement within the German Reich.

In 1933, shortly after Adolf Hitler became Chancellor, the Law for the Restoration of the Professional Civil Service was passed, which resulted in resignations and emigrations of many physicists, one of them was James Franck, who was director of the II. Physikalisches Institut, Universität Göttingen (Second Physics Institute at the Georg-August University of Göttingen). In 1935, an ordinance related to the Civil Services act, the Law on the Retirement and Transfer of Professors as a Result of the Reorganization of the German System of Higher Education, was used to forcibly transfer Georg Joos to Göttingen to fill Frank's position as ordinarius professor and director of the Second Physics Institute. In 1942, Kopfermann was appointed as ordinarius professor on the chair for experimental physics, formerly held by Franck and then Joos. From the start, he worked on the German nuclear energy project, also known as the Uranverein (Uranium Club). Additionally, he built a 6-MeV betatron, studied atomic beams, resonance, and the biological effects of radiation, and developed methods of optical interferometry.

As a principal in the Uranverein, Kopferman, with a couple of physicists under his direction, investigated and developed isotope separation techniques; their work included the construction of a mass spectrograph. The mass spectrograph was listed as one of twenty-five commissioned nuclear research projects granted between 1 April 1943 and 31 March 1944; the classified list accompanied a letter from Kurt Diebner, Reich Planning Officer, to the president of the Reichsforschungsrat (Reich Research Council) on 18 April 1944. Electromagnetic mass spectrometry was investigated for the separation of uranium isotopes.

From 1953, Kopfermann was an ordinarius professor and director of the I. Physikalisches Institut (First Physics Institute) at the Ruprecht-Karls-Universität Heidelberg. While there, he served on the council of CERN.

During 1956 and 1957, Kopfermann was vice-chairman of the Arbeitskreis Kernphysik (Nuclear Physics Working Group) of the Fachkommission II „Forschung und Nachwuchs“ (Commission II "Research and Growth") of the Deutsche Atomkommission (DAtK, German Atomic Energy Commission). Other members of the Nuclear Physics Working Group in both 1956 and 1957 were: Werner Heisenberg (chairman), Hans Kopfermann (vice-chairman), Fritz Bopp, Walther Bothe, Wolfgang Gentner, Otto Haxel, Willibald Jentschke, Heinz Maier-Leibnitz, Josef Mattauch, Wolfgang Riezler, Wilhelm Walcher, and Carl Friedrich von Weizsäcker. Wolfgang Paul was also a member of the group during 1957.

== Honors ==
Kopfermann was afforded a number of honors, which included election to the Academies of Göttingen, Heidelberg, and Copenhagen.

== Books ==
- Hans Kopfermann Kernmomente and Nuclear Momenta (Akademischer Verlag, 1940, 1956, and Academic Press, 1958)
- Hans Kopfermann Physics of the electron shells (The American FIAT review of German science, 1939-1945, Volume 12) (Office of Military Government for Germany Field Information Agencies, Technical, 1948)
- Hans Kopfermann Physik der Elektronenhüllen (Verlag Chemie, 1953)
- Hans Kopfermann Über optisches Pumpen an Gasen (Springer, 1960)

== Selected publications ==
- Hans Kopfermann and Rudolf Ladenburg Untersuchungen über die anomale Dispersion angeregter Gase II Teil. Anomale Dispersion in angeregtem Neon Einfluß von Strom und Druck, Bildung und Vernichtung angeregter Atome, Zeitschrift für Physik Volume 48, Numbers 1-2, 26-50 (1928). The authors were identified as being at Berlin-Dahlem. The article was received on 17 December 1927.
- Rudolf Landenburg and Hans Kopfermann Experimenteller Nachweis der negativen Dispersion, Z. Phys. Chemie Abt. A Volume 139, 375–385 (1928)
