= Alfons Bühl =

German physicist

Alfons Bühl (1900–1988) was a German physicist. From 1934 to 1945, he was director of the physics department at the Technische Hochschule Karlsruhe.

== Education ==
From 1919 to 1925, Bühl studied physics at the Friedrich-Wilhelms-Universität (today, the Humboldt-Universität zu Berlin) and the Ruprecht-Karls-Universität Heidelberg. He received his doctorate in 1925 under the Nobel Laureate Philipp Lenard at Heidelberg and was a teaching assistant to Lenard.

== Career ==
In 1928, Bühl became a teaching assistant at the Albert-Ludwigs-Universität Freiburg and from 1929 was a Privatdozent there in physics. From 1931 to 1933, he had a lectureship in the physics department at the Eidgenössische Technische Hochschule Zürich. In 1934, he replaced Wolfgang Gaede as director of the physics department at the Technische Hochschule Karlsruhe (today, the Universität Karlsruhe); Gaede had been forced out by the National Socialist regime as “politically unreliable” after he accepted the Duddell Medal of the London Physical Society in 1933. In 1936, Bühl was an untenured ausserordentlicher Professor and from 1937 to 1945 an ordentlicher Professor at the Technische Hochschule Karlsruhe.

Bühl was a physics advisor to the Nationalsozialistischer Deutscher Dozentenbund (NSDDB, National Socialist German University Lecturers League). In 1940, Bühl attended the historic meeting known as the Münchner Religionsgespräche confronting the Deutsche Physik movement; Bühl was a principal there supporting the movement.

When Adolf Hitler became Chancellor of Germany on 30 January 1933, the concept of Deutsche Physik took on more favor and fervor. Deutsche Physik was anti-Semitic and anti-theoretical physics, especially including modern physics, i.e., quantum mechanics. As applied in the university environment, political factors took priority over the historically applied concept of scholarly ability, even though its two most prominent supporters were Nobel Laureates Philipp Lenard and Johannes Stark. During the period in which Deutsche Physik was gaining prominence, a foremost concern of the great majority of scientists was to maintain autonomy against political encroachment. Some of the more established scientists, such as Max von Laue, could demonstrate more autonomy than the younger and less established scientists. This was, in part, due to political organizations, such as the NSDDB, whose district leaders had a decisive role in the acceptance of an Habilitationsschrift, which was a prerequisite to attaining the rank of Privatdozent necessary to becoming a university lecturer. While some with ability joined such organizations out of tactical career considerations, others with ability and adherence to historical academic standards joined these organizations to moderate their activities. This was the case of Wolfgang Finkelnburg. It was in the summer of 1940 that Finkelnburg became an acting director of the NSDDB at Technische Hochschule Darmstadt. As such, he organized the Münchner Religionsgespräche, which took place on 15 November 1940 and was known as the “Munich Synod.” The Münchner Religionsgespräche was an offensive against Deutsche Physik. Finkelnburg invited five representatives to make arguments for theoretical physics and academic decisions based on ability rather than politics: Carl Friedrich von Weizsäcker, Otto Scherzer, Georg Joos, Otto Heckmann, and Hans Kopfermann. Alfons Bühl, a supporter of Deutsche Physik, invited Harald Volkmann, Bruno Thüring, Wilhelm Müller, Rudolf Tomaschek, and Ludwig Wesch. The discussion was led by Gustav Borer, with Herbert Arthur Stuart and Johannes Malsch as observers. While the technical outcome may have been thin, it was a political victory against Deutsche Physik.

== Literature by Bühl ==
- Alfons Bühl Über die elektrische Doppelschicht an der Oberfläche von Quecksilber, Annalen der Physik, Volume 385, Issue 10, pp. 137–180 (1926)
- Alfons Bühl Über wasserfallelektrische Wirkung an Lösungen ein-einwertiger Elektrolyte, Annalen der Physik, Volume 388, Issue 16, pp. 1207–1224 (1927)
- Alfons Bühl Wasserfallelektrische Wirkung im Vakuum, Annalen der Physik, Volume 395, Issue 7, pp. 978–992 (1929)
- Alfons Bühl Philipp Lenard und die deutsche Naturforschung (1937) in Rudolf G. Weigel (editor) Philipp Lenard, der Vorkämpfer der Deutschen Physik Karlsruhe, Müller (= Karlsruher Akedemischen Reden, Number 17), as cited in Hentschel and Hentschel, 1996, References, page XCII, reference #920.
