= Rudolf Tomaschek =

German experimental physicist

Rudolf Karl Anton Tomaschek (23 December 1895 in Budweis, Bohemia – 8 February 1966, Breitbrunn am Chiemsee) was a German experimental physicist. His scientific efforts included work on phosphorescence, fluorescence, and (tidal) gravitation. Tomaschek was a supporter of deutsche Physik, which resulted in his suspension from his university posts after World War II. From 1948 to 1954, he worked in England for the Anglo-Iranian Oil Company (AIOC). In 1954, when AIOC became BP, he went to Germany and was president of the Permanent Tidal Commission.

== Education ==
From 1913 to 1918, Tomaschek studied at the Deutsche Universität Prag. He earned his doctorate in the early 1920s under Philipp Lenard, at the Ruprecht-Karls-Universität Heidelberg, and then became Lenard’s assistant. He completed his Habilitation under Lenard in 1924.

== Career ==
From 1921, he conducted several aether drift experiments, repetitions of the Michelson–Morley experiment and the Trouton–Noble experiment, whose negative outcome further supported Albert Einstein's special relativity – although Tomaschek was a critic of that theory.

In November 1926, Tomaschek went to the Technische Hochschule München (today, the Technical University of Munich) and then to Philipps-Universität Marburg, where he was appointed ausserordentlicher Professor (extraordinarius professor) for experimental physics, in late 1927. From 1934, Tomaschek was the director of the physics department at the Technische Hochschule Dresden (today, TU Dresden). From 1939 to 1945, Tomaschek was an ordentlicher Professor (ordinarius professor) and director of the physics department at the Technische Hochschule München.

Tomaschek was a supporter of deutsche Physik. The deutsche Physik movement was anti-Semitic and anti-theoretical physics. As applied in the university environment, political factors took priority over the historically applied concept of scholarly ability, even though its two most prominent supporters were the Nobel Laureates in Physics Philipp Lenard and Johannes Stark. When Adolf Hitler became Chancellor of Germany on 30 January 1933, the concept and movement took on more favor and more fervor. Supporters of deutsche Physik launched vicious attacks against leading theoretical physicists, including Arnold Sommerfeld and Werner Heisenberg.

It was in the summer of 1940 that Wolfgang Finkelnburg became an acting director of the Nationalsozialistischer Deutscher Dozentenbund (NSDDB, National Socialist German University Lecturers League) at the Technische Hochschule Darmstadt (today, Technische Universität Darmstadt). As such, he organized the Münchner Religionsgespräche, which took place on November 15, 1940. The event was an offensive against the deutsche Physik movement. Finkelnburg invited five representatives to make arguments for theoretical physics and academic decisions based on ability, rather than politics: Carl Friedrich von Weizsäcker, Otto Scherzer, Georg Joos, Otto Heckmann, and Hans Kopfermann. Alfons Bühl, a supporter of deutsche Physik, invited Harald Volkmann, Bruno Thüring, Wilhelm Müller, Rudolf Tomaschek, and Ludwig Wesch. The discussion was led by Gustav Borer, with Herbert Stuart and Johannes Malsch as observers. While the technical outcome of the event may have been thin, it was a political victory against deutsche Physik and signaled the decline of the influence of the movement within the German Reich.

In 1945, the Allied occupation authority in Germany suspended Tomaschek from his positions at the Technische Hochschule München; he was succeeded by Georg Joos in September 1946.

From 1948 to 1954, Tomaschek was employed at the Anglo-Iranian Oil Company (AIOC)'s Kirklington Hall Research Station, near Newark, England; AIOC became British Petroleum in 1954. From 1954, he went to Breitbrunn am Chiemsee, in Bavaria, where he continued his research activities; there he was President of the Permanenten Gezeitenkommission (Permanent Tidal Commission).

== Books by Tomaschek ==
- From 1933 to 1945, Tomaschek revised editions of Ernst Grimsehl’s Lehrbuch der Physik. Zum Gebrauch beim Unterricht neben akademischen Vorlesungen und zum Selbststudium (Teubner), starting with the 8th edition.
- Rudolf Tomaschek Die Messungen der zeitlichen Änderung der Schwerkraft (Springer 1937)
- Rudolf Tomaschek Leuchten und Struktur fester Stoffe (Oldenbourg, 1943)
- Rudolf Tomaschek Kosmische Kraftfelder und astrale Einflüsse (Ebertin 1959)
- Rudolf Tomaschek Probleme der Erdgezeitenforschung (Bayerische Akademie der Wissenschaften 1956)

== Literature by Tomaschek ==
- Alfred Eckert and Rudolf Tomaschek Zur Kenntnis des Mesonaphtobianthrons, Monatshefte für Chemie / Chemical Monthly Volume 39, Number 10 (1918). The authors were cited as being affiliated with the Chemischen Laboratorium der k. k. Deutschen Universität Prag, Tschechoslowakei.
- Rudolf Tomaschek Zur Kenntnis der Borsäurephosphore, Annalen der Physik Volume 372, Issue 5, pp. 612–648 (1922)
- Rudolf Tomaschek Über das Verhalten des Lichtes außerirdischer Lichtquellen, Annalen der Physik Volume 378, Issue 1, pp. 105–126 (1924)
- Rudolf Tomaschek Über die Phosphoreszenzeigenschaften der seltenen Erden in Erdalkaliphosphoren. I, Annalen der Physik, Volume 380, Issue 18, pp. 109–142 (1924)
- R. Tomaschek Über die Aberration, Zeitschrift für Physik Volume 32, Number 1 (1925). The author was cited as being in Heidelberg. The article was received on 18 March 1925.
- R. Tomaschek Über Versuche zur Auffindung elektrodynamischer Wirkungen der Erdbewegung in großen Höhen II, Annalen der Physik, Volume 385, Issue 13, pp. 509–514 (1926)
- R. Tomaschek Über die Emission der Phosphore I. Verhalten des Samariums in Sulfiden und Sulfaten, Annalen der Physik Volume 389, Issue 19, pp. 329–383 (1927)
- Rudolf Tomaschek and Henriette Tomaschek Über die Emission der Phosphore II. Umwandlung der Teilbanden im Samariumsulfidspektrum, Annalen der Physik Volume 389, Issue 24, pp. 1047–1073 (1927)
- R. Tomaschek and W. Schaffernicht Zu den gravimetrischen Bestimmungsversuchen der absoluten Erdbewegung, Astronomische Nachrichten, Volume 244, p. 257 (1932)
- R. Tomaschek and W. Schaffernicht Ether-Drift and Gravity, Nature Volume 129, 24-25 (1932)
- R. Tomaschek and W. Schaffernicht Tidal Oscillations of Gravity, Nature Volume 130, 165-166 (1932)
- R. Tomaschek and O. Deutschbein Über die Emission der Phosphore. III Verhalten des Samariums in den Oxyden der II. Gruppe, Annalen der Physik, Volume 408, Issue 8, pp. 930–948 (1933)
- R. Tomaschek and O. Deutschbein Fluorescence of Pure Salts of the Rare Earths. Nature Volume 131, 473-473 (1933)
- R. Tomaschek and O. Deutschbein Über den Zusammenhang der Emissions- und Absorptionsspektren der Salze der Seltenen Erden im festen Zustand I. Fremdstoffphosphore, Zeitschrift für Physik Volume 82, Numbers 5-6, 309-327 (1933). The authors were cited as being at the Physikal. Institut d. Universität, Marburg a. d. Lahn. The article was received on 17 February 1933.
- R. Tomaschek Schwerkraftmessungen, Die Naturwissenschaften Volume 25, Issue 12, pp. 177–185 (1937)
- R. Tomaschek On the application of phosphorescence spectra to the investigation of the structure of solids and solutions, Trans. Faraday Society Volume 35, 148 - 154 (1939)
- R. Tomaschek Non-elastic tilt of the Earth's crust due to meteorological pressure distributions, Pure and Applied Geophysics Volume 25, Number 1, 17-25 (1953). The author was cited as being at the Anglo-Iranian Oil Co. Research Centre, Kirklington Hall, Nr. Newark Notts, Notts, UK.
- R. Tomaschek Earth Tilts in the British Isles Connected With Far Distant Earthquakes, Nature Volume 176, 24 - 25 (1955). The author was cited as being affiliated with the British Petroleum Company, Ltd., Research Centre, Kirklington Hall, near Newark, Notts.
- R. Tomaschek Fundamental behaviour of sensitive springs, J. Sci. Instrum Volume 33, 78-81 (1955). The author was cited as being affiliated with the British Petroleum Co., Ltd., Kirklington Hall, Nr. Newark, Notts. The article was received 18 May 1955.
- R. Tomaschek Tidal Gravity Measurements in the Shetlands: Effect of the Total Eclipse of June 30, 1954, Nature Volume 175, 937 - 939 (1955)
- R. Tomaschek Measurements of tidal gravity and load deformations on Unst (Shetlands), Pure and Applied Geophysics Volume 37, Number 1, 55-78 (1957). The author was cited as being at Loiberting 7, Breitbrunn/Chiemsee, (West-Deutschland). The article was received on 15 June 1957.
- R. Tomaschek Great Earthquakes and the Astronomical Positions of Uranus, Nature Volume 184, 177 - 178 (1959). The author was cited as being in Breitbrunn-Chiemsee, Bavaria.
- R. Tomaschek and E. Groten Die Residualbewegungen in den Registrierungen der horizontalen Gezeitenkomponenten, Journal Pure and Applied Geophysics Volume 56, Number 1, 1-15 (1963). Tomaschek was identified as being in Breitbrunn-Chiemsee, and Groten was identified as being at Ohio-State University, Columbus, Ohio. The article was received on 5 July 1963.
