= Walter Weizel =

German physicist and politician (1901–1982)

Walter Friedrich Karl Weizel (1 August 1901 in Lauterecken – 6 August 1982) was a German theoretical physicist and politician. As a result of his opposition to National Socialism in Germany, he was forced into early retirement for a short duration in 1933. He was professor of theoretical physics at the Institute for Theoretical Physics, University of Bonn, from 1936 to 1969. After World War II, he helped to establish the Jülich Research Center, and he was a state representative of the Social Democratic Party of Germany.

== Education ==
From 1918 to 1925, Weizel studied chemistry at the University of Göttingen, the Ludwig-Maximilians-Universität München, and Heidelberg University. He received his doctorate in physical chemistry at Heidelberg University, under Max Trautz. He switched from chemistry to physics to work on the quantum mechanics of molecules as a fellow of the Notgemeinschaft der Deutschen Wissenschaft (NG; Emergency Association of German Science) at the University of Rostock. He completed his Habilitation in 1929.

== Career ==
After Habilitation, Weizel worked briefly at Badische Anilin- und Sodafabrik (BASF, Baden Aniline and Soda Factory) at Ludwigshafen. Then, during 1931, he had a Rockefeller fellowship to the University of Chicago.

From late in 1931, Weizel was an ordentlicher Professor (ordinarius professor) of theoretical physics at the Technische Hochschule Karlsruhe (today, the Karlsruhe Institute of Technology). After Adolf Hitler came to power in 1933, Weizel was temporarily forced into retirement due to his opposition to National Socialism. In 1936, he was called from the Technische Hochschule Karlsruhe to an ordinarius professorship at the University of Bonn.

On 1 December 1939, after more than four years of a selections process, due to academic and political differences between the Munich Faculty and both the Reichserziehungsministerium (REM, Reich Education Ministry) and the supporters of deutsche Physik, Wilhelm Carl Gottlieb Müller was selected to succeed Arnold Sommerfeld in the chair for theoretical physics at the Ludwig-Maximilians-Universität München. Müller was a supporter of deutsche Physik, which was anti-Semitic and had a bias against theoretical physics, especially quantum mechanics and the theory of relativity. The appointment of Wilhelm Müller – who was not a theoretical physicist, had not published in a physics journal, and was not a member of the Deutsche Physikalische Gesellschaft – as a replacement for Sommerfeld, was considered such a travesty and detrimental to educating a new generation of physicists that both Ludwig Prandtl, director of the Kaiser Wilhelm Institut für Strömungsforschung ( Kaiser Wilhelm Institute for Flow Research), and Carl Ramsauer, director of the research division of the Allgemeine Elektrizitäts-Gesellschaft (General Electric Company) and president of the Deutsche Physikalische Gesellschaft, made reference to this in their correspondence to officials in the Reich. In an attachment to Prandtl’s 28 April 1941 letter to Reich Marshal Hermann Göring, Prandtl referred to the appointment as “sabotage” of necessary theoretical physics instruction. In an attachment to Ramsauer’s 20 January 1942 letter to Reich Minister Bernhard Rust, Ramsauer concluded that the appointment amounted to the “destruction of the Munich theoretical physics tradition.” When Müller, as editor, published the document Jüdische und deutsche Physik, Weizel published a very critical review of the booklet pointing out its inconsistencies; his review had the support of the Faculty of Science and Mathematics at the University of Bonn.

After World War II, Weizel focused his scientific research on the physics of electrical discharges in gases. He was involved in the establishment of the Forschungszentrum Jülich (Jülich Research Center). Also after World War II, he was a representative of the Sozialdemokratische Partei Deutschlands (SPD, Social Democratic Party of Germany). From 1946 to 1954 he was a Bonn city delegate, and from 1948 to 1954 he was deputy SPD chairman of the Council of the City of Bonn. From 14 July 1954 to 12 July 1958, he was a member of the Landtag (State Diet) of North Rhine-Westphalia. Weizel held his professorship at the University of Bonn until he reached emeritus status in 1969.

== Selected literature by Weizel ==
- W. Weizel Über die Banden des Lithiumhydrids und Lithiums, Zeitschrift für Physik Volume 60, Numbers 9-10, 599-602 (September 1930). Received: 22 January 1930. Affiliation: Physikalisehen Institut der Universität Rostock.
- Walter Weizel The Broadening of the Resonance Atomic Line of Helium, Phys. Rev. Volume 38, 642 - 645 (1931). Received 12 June 1931. Institutional affiliation: Ryerson Physical Laboratory, University of Chicago. The author was cited as being a Fellow of the Rockfeller Foundation.
- W. Finkelnburg and W. Weizel Über das kontinuierliche Wasserstoffspektrum. Der Verlauf seiner Anregungsspannung und seine Deutung, Zeitschrift für Physik Volume 68, Numbers 9-10, 577-584 (September, 1931). Received: 23 February 1931. Affiliations: Finkelburg, Physikalisch-Chemischen Institut der Universität Berlin, Deutschland, and Weizel, Physikalischen Institut der Universität Rostock, Deutschland.
- W. Weizel and O. Beeck, Ionisierung und Anregung durch Ionenstoß, Zeitschrift für Physik Volume 76, Numbers 3-4, 250-257 (March, 1932). Received: 24 February 1932. Affiliations: Weizel, Karlsruhe, and Beeck, Pasadena.
- W. Weizel Über das Rotationsschwingungsspektrum des Wasserdampfes, Zeitschrift für Physik Volume 88, Numbers 3-4, 214-217 (March, 1934). Received: 23 January 1934. Affiliation: Karlsruhe.
- W. Weizel Hauptachsentransformation von Vierpolmatrizen und ihre Anwendung, Electrical Engineering (Archiv für Elektrotechnik) Volume 33, Number 3, 196-201 (March, 1939). Received: 5 November 1938. Affiliation: Bonn.
- W. Weizel, R. Rompe, and M. Schön Zur Theorie der kathodischen Entladungsteile eines Lichtbogens, Zeitschrift für Physik Volume 115, Numbers 3-4, 179-201 (March, 1940). Received: 27 December 1939. Affiliations: Weizel, Institut für theoretische Physik, Bonn; Rompe and Schön, Studiengesellschaft für elektrische Beleuchtung, Berlin.
- Rompel and W. Weizel Über das Toeplersche Funkengesetz, Zeitschrift für Physik Volume 122, Numbers 9-12, 636-639 (September, 1944). Received: 24 January 1944. Affiliations: Rompe, Studiengesellschaft für elektrische Beleuchtung, Berlin; Weizel, Institut für theoretische Physik, Bonn.
- W. Weizel and R. Rompe Theorie des elektrischen Funkens, Annalen der Physik, Volume 436, Issue 6, 285-300 (1947)
- W. Thouret, W. Weizel, and P. Günther Lichtbögen mit Brennfleck und ohne Brennfleck, Zeitschrift für Physik Volume 130, Number 5, 621-631 (October, 1951). Received: 15 August 1951. Affiliations: Weizel, Physikalisches Institut der Universität, Bonn; Thouret and Günther, Quarzlampen G.m.b.H., Hanau.
- W. Weizel Ableitung der Quantentheorie aus einem klassischen, kausal determinierten Modell (Derivation of quantum theory from a classical, causally determined model), Zeitschrift für Physik Volume 134, Number 3, 264-285 (June, 1953). Received: 17 October 1952. Affiliation: Institut für Theoretische Physik, Bonn.
- W. Weizel Ableitung der quantenmechanischen Wellengleichung des Mehrteilchensystems aus einem klassischen Modell, Zeitschrift für Physik Volume 136, Number 5, 582-604 (October, 1953). Received: 14 October 1953. Affiliation: Institut für Theoretische Physik der Universität, Bonn.
- G. Ecker and W. Weizel Zustandssumme und effektive Ionisierungsspannung eines Atoms im Inneren des Plasmas, Annalen der Physik, Volume 452, Issue 2, 126-140 (1955)

== Books by Weizel ==
- Walter Weizel Einführung in die Physik, Band 1. Mechanik (Bibliographisches Institut, 1944, 1947, 1950, 1959)
- Walter Weizel Einführung in die Physik. Band 2. Elektrizität und Magnetismus (Bibliographisches Institut, 1944, 1947, 1950, 1951, 1958, 1959, 1971)
- Walter Weizel Einführung in die Physik Band 3: Optik, Atomphysik, Wärme (Bibliographisches Institut, 1944, 1947, 1951, 1958, 1959)
- Walter Weizel Elektronen Atome Molekule (Volk und Wissen, 1948, 1949, 1950)
- Walter Weizel Lehrbuch der Theoretischen Physik (Springer, 1949)
- Walter Weizel and Robert Rompe Theorie Elektrischer Lichtbögen und Funken (Barth, 1949)
- Walter Weizel Einführung in die Physik. Band 3. Optik und der Bau der Materie (Bibliographisches Institut, 1951, 1959)
- Walter Weizel Einführung in die Physik. Band 1. Mechanik und Wärme (Bibliographisches Institut, 1958)
- Walter Weizel Einführung in die Physik. Band 5. Optik und Atomphysik (Bibliographisches Institut, 1959)
- Walter Weizel Physikalische Formelsammlung. Band 1. Mechanik, Strömungslehre, Elektrodynamik (Bibliographisches Institut, 1962)
- Walter Weizel Physikalische Formelsammlung. Band 2: Optik, Thermodynamik, Relativitätstheorie. (Bibliographisches Institut, 1964)
- Walter Weizel Physikalische Formelsammlung. Band 3. Quantentheorie (Bibliographisches Institut, 1960, 1966)

== Bibliography ==
- Beyerchen, Alan D. Scientists Under Hitler: Politics and the Physics Community in the Third Reich (Yale, 1977) ISBN 0-300-01830-4
- Hentschel, Klaus (Editor) and Ann M. Hentschel (Editorial Assistant and Translator) Physics and National Socialism: An Anthology of Primary Sources (Birkhäuser, 1996)
