= Wilhelm Orthmann =

German physicist

Wilhelm Orthmann (1 May 1901 – 6 July 1945) was a German physicist. He was director of the physico-technical department of the Industrial College of Berlin. During World War II, he was also employed by the Reich Aviation Ministry.

== Education ==
Educated at Pforta, Orthmann studied at the Martin-Luther-Universität Halle-Wittenberg and the Friedrich-Wilhelms-Universität (today, the Humboldt-Universität zu Berlin). He received his doctorate in 1926, under Peter Pringsheim, with a thesis on resonance lines.

== Career ==
After receipt of his doctorate, he was a teaching assistant to Peter Pringsheim and Walther Nernst at the University of Berlin. He completed his Habilitation at the University of Berlin in 1931; his professorial thesis was on the dielectric constants of electrolytes. From 1931, he was a Privatdozent at the University of Berlin.

From 1938 Orthmann was an untenured ausserordentlicher Professor (extraordinarius professor), from 1940 an ausserordentlicher Professor, and from 1942 an ordentlicher Professor (ordinarius professor) and director of the physico-technical department at the Wirtschaftshochschule Berlin (Industrial College of Berlin).

Orthmann, an assistant to Walther Nernst, helped Lise Meitner build an improved calorimeter with which to measure the average energy per beta particle emitted by Radium E, i.e., ^{210}Bi_{83}. Their results were submitted for publication in late 1929.

The Law for the Restoration of the Professional Civil Service of 1933 was substantially directed at academia. The Deutsche Physikalische Gesellschaft (DPG) dragged its feet in the dismissal of Jews for more than five years. It was not until the end of 1938, on the initiation of a petition by Herbert Arthur Stuart and Wilhelm Orthmann, who were engaged in physics studies (academic) reform, that the DPG asked Jewish members to withdraw their membership.

During World War II, Orthmann was also employed at the Reichsluftfahrtministerium (RLM), finally as a scientific advisor in the development of anti-aircraft artillery. Taken prisoner at the capitulation of Berlin Orthmann died in the Soviet POW-camp at Landsberg (Warthe) on 6 July 1945.

== Literature by Orthmann ==
- Wilhelm Orthmann: Über die Stoßdämpfung der Quecksilberresonanzlinie, Annalen der Physik, Vierte Folge Band 78 No. 23 (1925) pp. 601–640, wiley.com
- Lise Meitner und Wilhelm Orthmann: Über eine absolute Bestimmung der Energie der primären ß-Strahlen von Radium E, Zeitschrift für Physik Volume 60, 143 – 155 (March 1930) springer.com
- W. Orthmann: Über Dielektrizitätskonstanten von Elektrolytlösungen. Annalen der Physik, 5. Folge, 1931, Band 9, Heft 5, pp. 537 — 569, wiley.com
- W. Orthmann: Über die Ausbildung des Physikers and Bemerkung zum Frauenstudium, Deutsche Mathematik Volume 4, 117 books.google – 126 (1939), as cited in Hentschel and Hentschel, 1996, p. LXXXII; see Reference [667]. These were Orthmann’s reports on an initiative to reform physics education presented at the first Mathematikerlager (German mathematics camp) organized by the Nationalsozialistischer Deutscher Dozentenbund (NSDDB, National Socialist German University Lecturers League, cf. Hentschel and Hentschel, 1996, 182 n2.
