= Stark (crater) =

Crater on the Moon

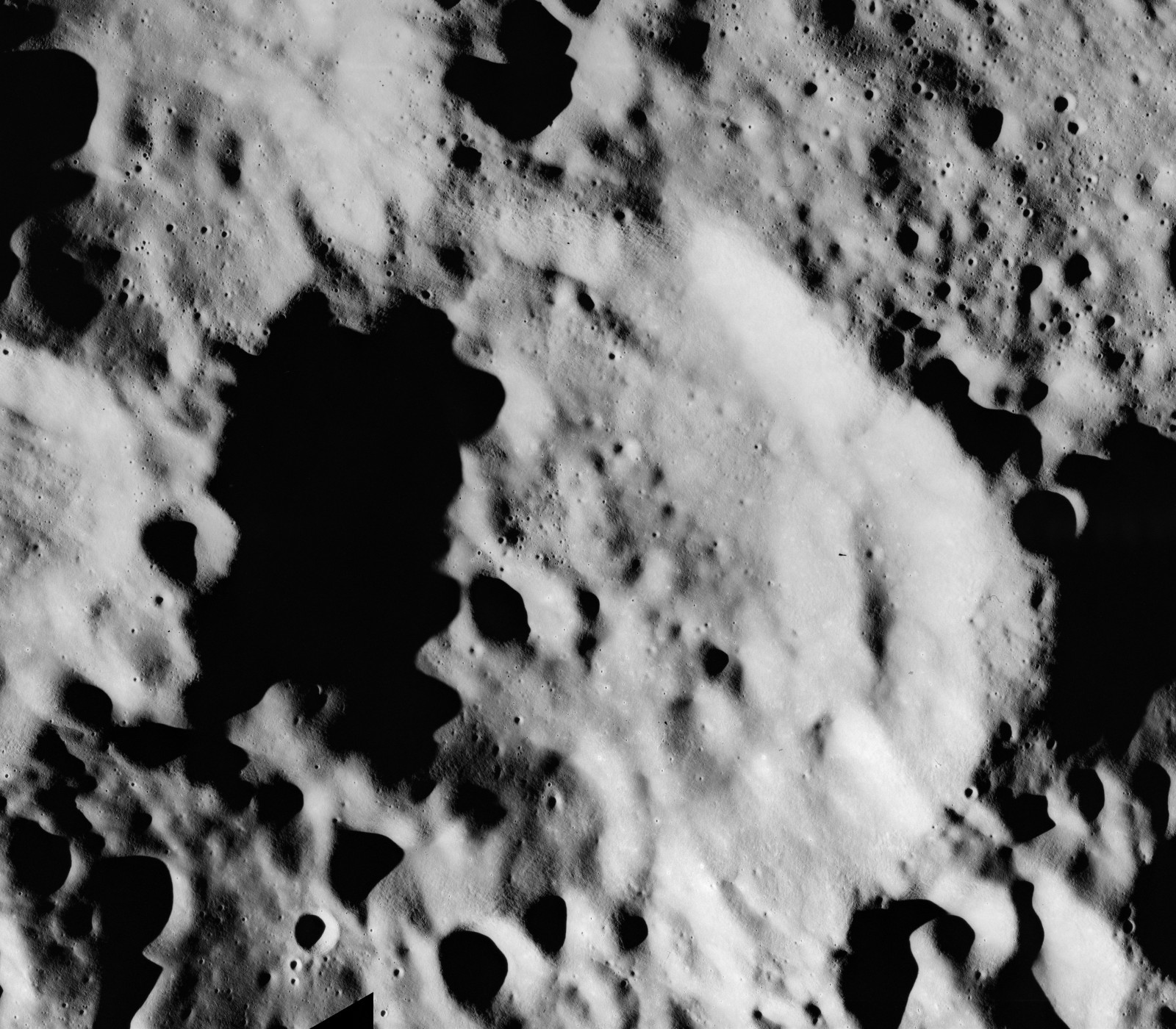
- Apollo 15 mapping camera image
- Coordinates: 25.5°S 134.6°E
- Diameter: 49 km
- Depth: 2.2 km
- Colongitude: 187° at sunrise
- Eponym: Johannes Stark

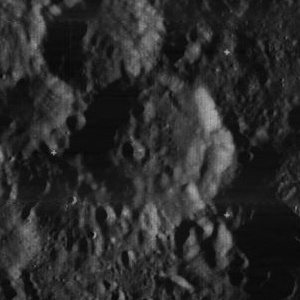
Lunar Orbiter 3 image

Stark is the disallowed name of a lunar impact crater on the far side of the Moon. It lies to the southeast of the prominent crater Tsiolkovskiy, and north of Subbotin.

This is a heavily eroded crater with a jumbled outer rim and uneven interior. The pair of slightly smaller satellite craters Stark Y and Stark V are attached to the northwest and western exterior respectively, creating a triple-crater formation. (The designations Homer for Stark Y and Sappho for Stark V were suggested for these features, but the IAU rejected these names.) Within the interior of Stark is a small crater located just to the south of the midpoint.

This crater was named after German physicist Johannes Stark (1874-1957), the 1919 Nobel laureatte in physics who was noted for his discovery of the Stark effect. Its designation was officially adopted by the International Astronomical Union (IAU) in 1970. In 2020, upon learning of Stark's support for the Nazi Party, Charles Wood, the chair of the Task Group for Lunar Nomenclature at the IAU, recommended to the IAU that the name "Stark" be replaced. The name was dropped on August 12, 2020. Since then, this crater is officially unnamed.

== Satellite craters ==
By convention these features are identified on lunar maps by placing the letter on the side of the crater midpoint that is closest to Stark.

Stark	Latitude	Longitude	Diameter
R	26.3° S	133.2° E	21 km
V	25.1° S	133.3° E	25 km
Y	24.4° S	134.0° E	31 km

== See also ==
- Lenard (crater), another lunar crater whose name was dropped in 2020 due to Nazi connections.
