= Lenard (crater) =

Crater on the Moon

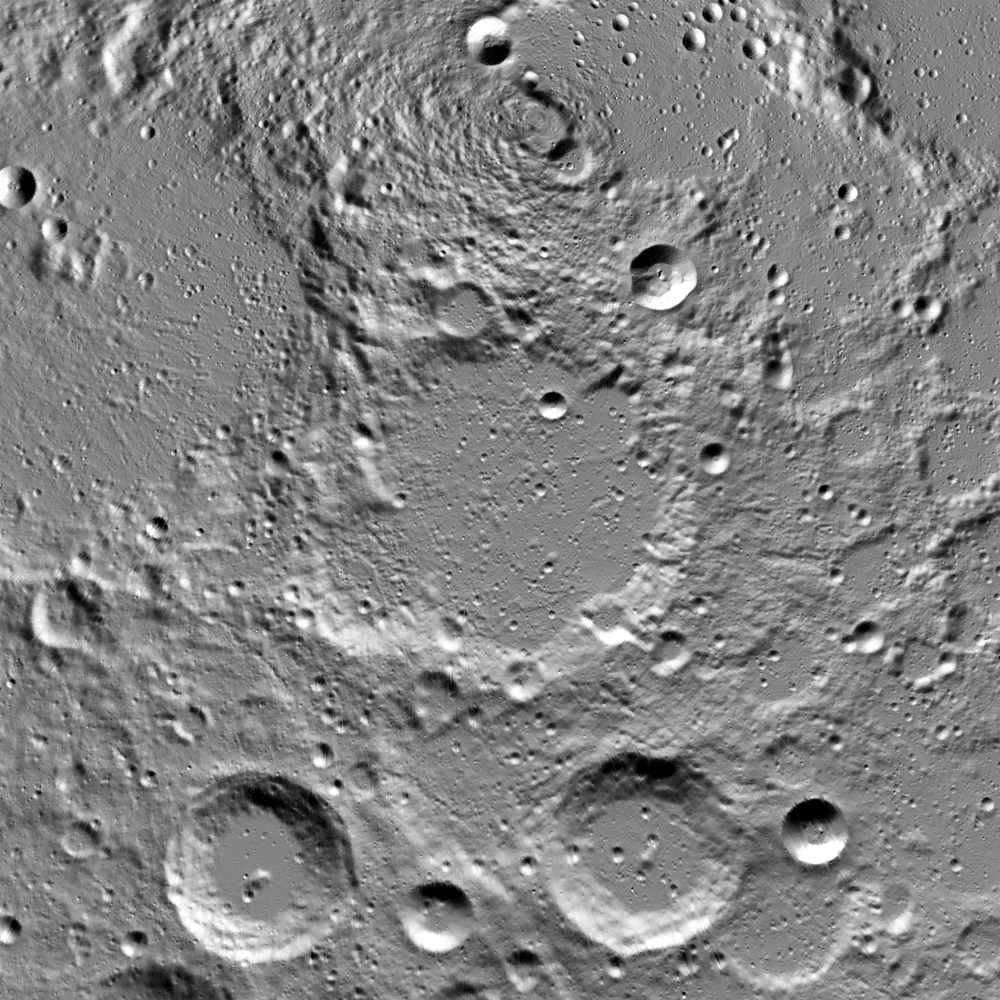
- Lenard is joined to lower left side of larger crater Hermite (center)
- Coordinates: 85.2°N 105.0°W
- Diameter: 48 km
- Eponym: Philipp Lenard

Lenard is the former name of a lunar impact crater located on the lunar far side near the northern pole. The crater forms some of the wall of the crater Hermite, and is located North of the craters Lovelace and Froelich. Lenard was named after German physicist Philipp Lenard by the IAU, formally adopted as such in 2008.

In 2020, upon learning of Lenard's support for the Nazi Party, Charles Wood, the chair of the Task Group for Lunar Nomenclature at the IAU, recommended to the IAU that the name "Lenard" be replaced. The name was dropped on August 12, 2020. Since then, this crater is officially unnamed.

== See also ==
- Stark (crater), another lunar crater whose name was dropped in 2020 due to Nazi connections.
