= Wilhelm Müller (physicist) =

German mathematician and physicist (1880–1968)

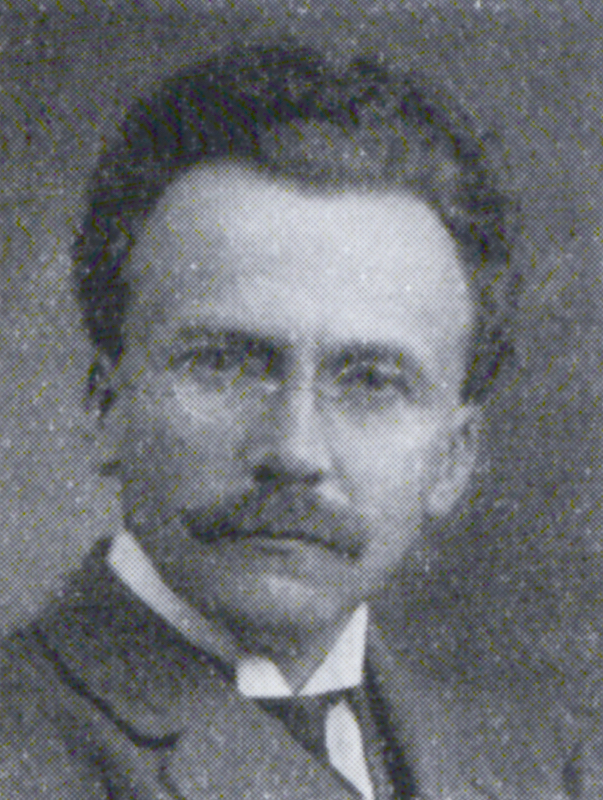
Wilhelm Müller

Wilhelm Carl Gottlieb Müller (25 September 1880 – 16 June 1968) was a German physicist, mathematician, and philosopher. He is best known for his political appointment as the successor of Arnold Sommerfeld as professor of theoretical physics at the Ludwig-Maximilians-Universität München.

== Life ==
Wilhelm Müller was born in Hamburg, the son of a merchant.

He studied at Leipzig University and earned his Rigorosum in mathematics, physics, and philosophy with the grade "very good". He went on to earn his PhD with Otto Hölder and Karl Rohn and a dissertation called "The rational curve of degree five in the five-, four-, three- and two-dimensional space" in 1911. At Leibniz University Hannover, he got his habilitation and became a Privatdozent in 1921, and later was appointed associate professor. In 1928, he became a professor at the Charles University in Prague. He joined the Nazi Party in 1933, and went on to join the Sturmabteilung in 1936. In 1934, he accepted a position as professor and director of the Aeronautical Institute at RWTH Aachen University.

His appointment in 1939 as professor of theoretical physics at the Ludwig-Maximilians-Universität München, a chair which had previously been held by Arnold Sommerfeld, but had been vacant for several years, was at the center of a controversy between modern physics and German physics. Müller, an aerodynamicist, had not been thought of as a theoretical physicist before this time, and opposed the "new" theoretical physics promoted by scientists such as Albert Einstein. His appointment is seen by historians as political, and during his tenure he would teach only classical physics. He was dismissed in 1945 and barred from academia during allied denazification proceedings.

== Works ==
- 1911 - The rational curve of degree five in the five-, four, three- and two-dimensional space (Die rationale Kurve fünfter Ordnung im fünf-, vier-, drei- und zweidimensionalen Raum; dissertation, Universität Leipzig, Karl Rohn, Otto Hölder)
- 1922 - The sense of chastity (Vom Sinn der Keuschheit)
- 1925 - The Eternal Grail (Vom ewigen Gral)
- 1925 - Dynamics (Dynamik) (1952)
- 1928 - Mathematical Fluid Mechanics (Mathematische Strömungslehre)
- 1932 - Introduction to the theory of viscous fluids (Einführung in die Theorie der zähen Flüssigkeiten)
- 1933 - Jewry and Leadership (Judentum und Führertum)
- 1936 - Introduction to Aerodynamics (Einführung in die Mechanik des Fluges) (1942, 1953, 1958)
- 1936 - Jewry and Science (Judentum und Wissenschaft)
- 1941 - Jewish and German Physics (Jüdische und Deutsche Physik), together with Johannes Stark
- 1944 - The Battle in Physics (Kampf in der Physik)
- 1959 - Theory of Elastic Deformation (Theorie der elastischen Verformung)
