= Walter Schultze =

German physician and Nazi official (1894–1979)

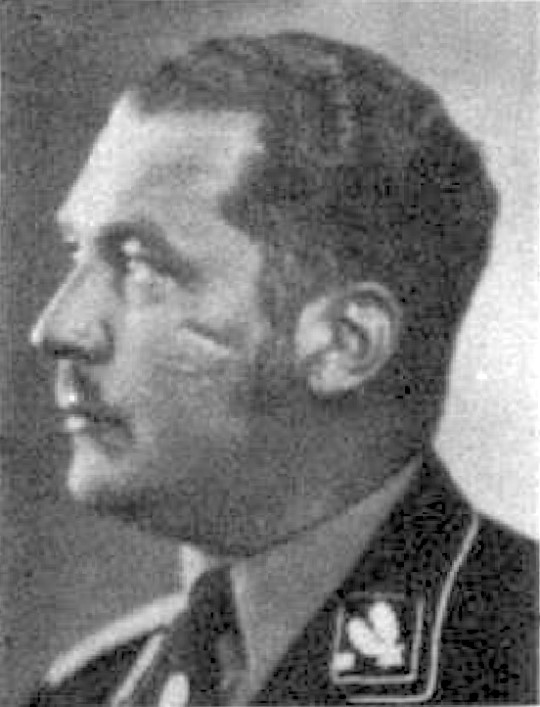
- Schultze in 1938

Reich Leader, National Socialist German Lecturers League
- In office 24 July 1935 – June 1944
- Preceded by: Position created
- Succeeded by: Gustav Adolf Scheel

Additional positions
- 1938–1945: Member of the Reichstag
- 1932–1933: Member of the Landtag of Bavaria
- 1926–1931: City Councilor, Speyer

Personal details
- Born: Walter August Ludwig Schultze; 1 January 1894 Hersbruck, Kingdom of Bavaria, German Empire
- Died: 16 August 1979 (aged 85) Krailling, West Germany
- Party: Nazi Party
- Education: Doctor of Medicine
- Alma mater: Ludwig-Maximilians-Universität München
- Profession: Surgeon
- Known for: Aktion T4
- Civilian awards: Blood Order; Golden Party Badge
- Nickname: Bubi

Military service
- Allegiance: German Empire
- Branch/service: Royal Bavarian Army; Luftstreitkräfte
- Years of service: 1914–1917
- Rank: Oberleutnant
- Unit: 2nd Royal Bavarian Heavy Cavalry
- Battles/wars: World War I
- Military awards: Iron Cross, 1st and 2nd class War Merit Cross, 1st and 2nd class Wound Badge

Walter Schultze (1 January 1894 – 16 August 1979) was a German physician, state health official, Nazi Party politician and the leader of the National Socialist German Lecturers League in Nazi Germany between 1935 and 1944. He was also a member of the Schutzstaffel (SS), attaining the rank of SS-Gruppenführer. After the end of the Second World War, he was arrested and charged with assisting in the mass murder of hundreds of disabled people in Bavaria under the Aktion T4 program. After lengthy delays and multiple legal proceedings, he was convicted and sentenced to four years at hard labor in 1960.

== Early life in the German Empire ==
Walter Schultze was born the son of a Bavarian Oberregierungsrat (senior government councilor). He attended Volksschule and a humanistic Gymnasium and obtained his Abitur at Landshut in 1912. He studied medicine at the Ludwig-Maximilians-Universität München and was a student corps member of the Corps Isaria. Schultze participated in the First World War as a one-year volunteer from 1914. Initially, he served in the 2nd Royal Bavarian Heavy Cavalry Regiment and later as an aircraft observer with the Luftstreitkräfte. In 1917, he left military service as a severely war-disabled Oberleutnant, having been awarded the Iron Cross, 1st and 2nd class and the Wound Badge. He returned to the university but joined the Freikorps Epp for a short time in 1919. He then completed his studies in medicine and received his Doctor of Medicine degree in 1919.

== Weimar Republic years ==
As a member of a nationalist student organization, Schultze joined the German Workers' Party in 1919, which renamed itself the Nazi Party (NSDAP) in 1920. In 1921, he joined the Sturmabteilung (SA), the Party's paramilitary organization. He became a staff doctor of the SA regiment in Munich and, from March to November 1923, he was the chief of medical services in the SA High Command. In November 1923, he participated in the failed Beer Hall Putsch for which he was later awarded the Blood Order. Schultze was at Adolf Hitler's side and arranged a getaway car to help the injured Hitler to escape to Uffing.

Schultze rejoined the Party after its re-establishment in 1925 and became the Ortsgruppenleiter (local group leader) in Speyer. However, because his records were lost, he was forced to reapply. He was issued party membership number 99,822 in October 1928. After additional medical training, Schultze became a specialist in surgery in 1926. From 1926 to 1931, he served as a medical officer for the Palatinate Agricultural Trade Association in Speyer and also served as a city councilor. In 1929, he was a founding member of the National Socialist German Doctors' League. In 1931, he returned to Munich as a medical officer, and later the senior medical officer, for the Agricultural Trade Association of Upper Bavaria. From July 1931 to April 1932, he was the regimental medical officer for SA-Standarte 50 in Munich and also was named Deputy Reich Physician of the SA with the rank of SA-Sanitäts-Standartenführer. On 1 July 1932, he advanced to SA-Sanitäts-Gruppenführer, and served until 25 August 1933 as the Gruppe physician of the SA-Gruppe Hochland in Munich. On 24 April 1932, Schultze was elected as a Nazi Party deputy to the Landtag of Bavaria where he served until its dissolution by the Nazis in October 1933.

== Career in Nazi Germany ==
After the Nazi seizure of power, Schultze was appointed State Commissioner for Health in the Bavarian State Ministry of the Interior from March to November 1933. At that time, he was promoted to Ministerialdirektor and headed the Department of Health in the ministry from November 1933 to May 1945. In 1934, he was appointed as an honorary professor for public health at the Ludwig-Maximilians-Universität München, and he also served as the president of the State Medical Academy in Munich. Schultze headed the university faculty department in the National Socialist Teachers League and sat on its Reichsleitung (national leadership board) from 1935 to 1943. He also was the head of Regional Group VII (Bavaria) in the German Red Cross.

In July 1935, he was appointed to the post for which he is best known, Reichsdozentenführer (Reich Lecturer Leader) of the National Socialist German Lecturers League (NSDDB), whose task was the political control and ideological indoctrination of university professors. During his tenure, Schultze played a key part in implementing Nazi racial policies, and was responsible for driving Jewish lecturers out of German universities. He asserted in a speech to the NSDDB in June 1939 that the success of German universities depended on having "the type of the combat-ready political, National Socialist fighters who regard their 'Volk' as the supreme good". Adherence to Nazi political ideology, rather than to independent scholarship or subject matter expertise, was to be the guiding principle of the university community. Schultze also delivered a speech at the University of Strasbourg on 23 November 1941, in which he stated the institution's goal as: "Whatever is un-German in the thinking of our people must be eradicated". After nearly nine years as the head of the NSDDB, Schultze was removed from this position by the Supreme Party Court in June 1944 for an abuse of office to the detriment of a Party comrade.

In his paramilitary service, Schultze transferred from the SA to the Schutzstaffel (SS) on 13 September 1936 (SS number 276,831) with the rank of SS-Oberführer and was promoted to SS-Brigadeführer on 12 September 1937. He attained the rank of SS-Gruppenführer on 30 January 1943. At the April 1938 parliamentary election, Schultze was elected from the Party electoral list as a deputy to the Reichstag and retained this seat until the fall of the Nazi regime.

== Post-war life and prosecutions ==
At the end of the Second World War, Schultze was interned as a prisoner of war by American forces. As a Nazi physician, he had been involved in the Aktion T4 program of involuntary euthanasia that systematically killed physically and mentally disabled men, women and children. Schultze selected and ordered the transfer of patients from the sanatoriums and nursing homes in Erlangen and Kutzenberg to the Hartheim killing centre. At least 380 cases of aiding and abetting the killing of disabled people were traced to him. Though not charged with the actual commission of the murders, he was tried, convicted and sentenced to three years in prison by the Munich Regional Court on 16 November 1948 for aiding and abetting manslaughter. He appealed for a revision of the sentence, and the state prosecutor recommended that the sentence be nullified and a new trial be held. This was delayed until 1960 by the defendant's inability to stand trial due to a lengthy illness. At his new trial, he was convicted and sentenced to four years at hard labor by a Munich court on 10 May 1960 for assisting in the murder of 380 mental patients. Schultze expressed no remorse, saying: "never for one moment did I feel that I had committed an injustice or crime". Schultze's appeal was rejected by the Federal Constitutional Court at Karlsruhe on 21 January 1961.

Walter Schultze died on 16 August 1979 in Krailling, near Munich.

== Sources ==
- Campbell, Bruce (1998). The SA Generals and the Rise of Nazism. Lexington: University Press of Kentucky. ISBN 978-0-813-12047-8.
- Klee, Ernst (2007). Das Personenlexikon zum Dritten Reich. Wer war was vor und nach 1945. Frankfurt-am-Main: Fischer-Taschenbuch-Verlag. ISBN 978-3-596-16048-8.
- Lilla, Joachim: Schultze, Walter, in Bavaricon: Staatsminister, leitende Verwaltungsbeamte und (NS-)Funktionsträger in Bayern 1918 bis 1945.
- Schiffer Publishing Ltd., ed. (2000). SS Officers List: SS-Standartenführer to SS-Oberstgruppenführer (As of 30 January 1942). Schiffer Military History Publishing. ISBN 0-7643-1061-5.
- Stockhorst, Erich (1985). 5000 Köpfe: Wer War Was im 3. Reich. Arndt. ISBN 978-3-887-41116-9.
- Wistrich, Robert S. (1982). Who's Who in Nazi Germany. Macmillan Publishing Co. ISBN 0-02-630600-X.
- Zentner, Christian; Bedürftig, Friedemann, eds. (1997) [1991]. The Encyclopedia of the Third Reich. New York: Da Capo Press. ISBN 978-0-306-80793-0.
