= Freihung =

- Municipality
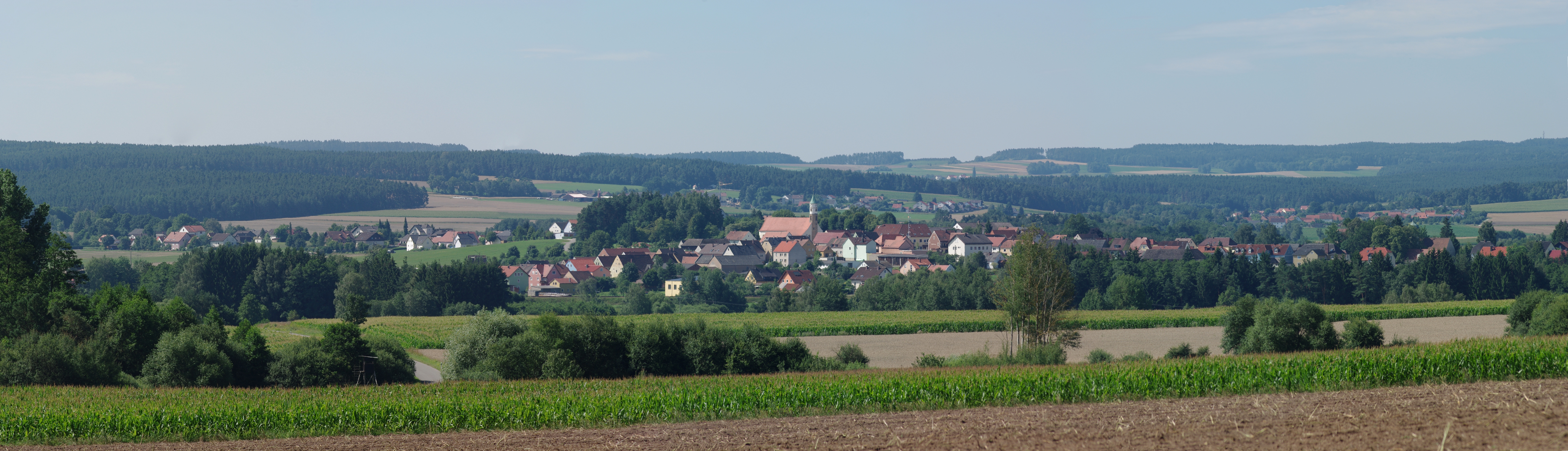
- Freihung

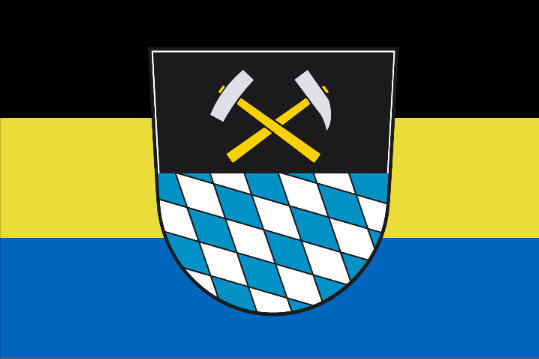
- Flag Coat of arms

- Location of Freihung within Amberg-Sulzbach district
- Interactive map of Freihung
- Location within Germany Location within Bavaria
- Coordinates: 49°37′N 11°55′E
- Country: Germany
- State: Bavaria
- Admin. region: Oberpfalz
- District: Amberg-Sulzbach

Government
  - Mayor (2020–26): Uwe König (FW)

Area
  - Total: 46.35 km^{2} (17.90 sq mi)
- Elevation: 418–438 m (1,371–1,437 ft)

Population (2025-12-31)
  - Total: 2,512
  - Density: 54.20/km^{2} (140.4/sq mi)
- Time zone: UTC+01:00 (CET)
  - Summer (DST): UTC+02:00 (CEST)
- Postal codes: 92271
- Dialling codes: 09646, 09622 (Groß-/Kleinschönbrunn)
- Vehicle registration: AS
- Website: www.markt-freihung.de

Freihung (German pronunciation: [ˈfʁaɪʊŋ]) is a municipality in the district of Amberg-Sulzbach in Bavaria in Germany.

== Geography ==
Apart from Freihung the municipality consists of the following villages:

- Blauenneuschacht
- Böcklmühle
- Elbart
- Freihungsand
- Großschönbrunn
- Hämmerleinshof
- Hämmerleinsmühle
- Kleinschönbrunn
- Konradinsgrund
- Mauerhof
- Riedhof
- Rothaar
- Rumpelmühle
- Schallermühle
- Schickenhof
- Schmelzmühle
- Schwadermühle
- Seugast
- Tanzfleck
- Thansüß
- Weickenricht

== Notable people ==
- Johannes Stark (born 15 April 1874 in Schickenhof – 21 June 1957), physicist and winner of the Nobel Prize in Physics in 1919
