= Wolfgang Finkelnburg =

German physicist (1905–1967)

Wolfgang Karl Ernst Finkelnburg (5 June 1905 – 7 November 1967) was a German physicist who made contributions to spectroscopy, atomic physics, the structure of matter, and high-temperature arc discharges. His vice-presidency of the Deutsche Physikalische Gesellschaft, from 1941 to 1945, was influential in that organization’s ability to assert its independence from Nazi policies.

== Education ==
Finkelnburg began his studies of physics and mathematics in 1924 at the University of Tübingen and the University of Bonn. He acquired his doctorate in 1928 under Heinrich Konen, and remained as Konen’s teaching assistant. In 1931 he became a teaching assistant at the Technische Hochschule Karlsruhe, and in 1932 he became a Privatdozent there.

== Career ==
=== Early career ===
In 1933 and 1934, Finkelnburg took a Rockefeller Foundation Fellowship and did postdoctoral research and studies on continuous spectra, with Robert Andrews Millikan at the California Institute of Technology. In 1936, he became an extraordinarius professor at the Technische Universität Darmstadt. From 1942 to 1945, he was an extraordinarius professor and director of the physics department at the University of Strasbourg. At Strasboug, he worked on high-temperature carbon arcs, which had applications to anti-aircraft searchlights. Some of his scientific endeavors after the war carried on with themes related to the carbon arcs.

=== National Socialism: Politics and physics ===
When Adolf Hitler became Chancellor of Germany on 30 January 1933, the concept of Deutsche Physik took on more favor. Deutsche Physik was antisemitic and anti-theoretical physics, especially modern physics such as quantum mechanics. As applied in the university environment, political factors took priority over the historically applied concept of scholarly ability, even though its two most prominent supporters were Nobel Laureates Philipp Lenard and Johannes Stark. Supporters of Deutsche Physik launched vicious attacks against leading theoretical physicists, such as Max Planck, Arnold Sommerfeld, and Werner Heisenberg; one of these attacks was published in the Schutzstaffel’s organ Das Schwarze Korps. In the political environment of National Socialism, these attacks were taken seriously.

During the period in which Deutsche Physik was gaining prominence, a foremost concern of scientists was to maintain autonomy against political encroachment. Some more established scientists, such as Max von Laue, could demonstrate more autonomy than those who were younger and less established. This was, in part, due to political organizations, such as the National Socialist German Lecturers League (NSDDB), whose district leaders had a decisive role in the acceptance of an Habilitationsschrift, which was a prerequisite to attaining the rank of Privatdozent necessary to becoming a university lecturer. While some joined such organizations out of tactical career considerations, others with adherence to historical academic standards joined these organizations to moderate their activities. This was the case of Finkelnburg. It was in the summer of 1940 that Finkelnburg became an acting director of the NSDDB at Technische Hochschule Darmstadt. As such, he organized the Münchner Religionsgespräche, which took place on 15 November 1940 and was known as the “Munich Synod". The Münchner Religionsgespräche was an offensive against Deutsche Physik. While the technical outcome may have been thin, it was a political victory against Deutsche Physik. Also, in part, it was Finkelnburg’s role in organizing this event that influenced Carl Ramsauer, as president of the Deutsche Physikalische Gesellschaft, to select Finkelnburg in 1941 as his deputy. Finkelnburg served in this capacity until the end of World War II.

=== After World War II ===
During the period 1946 to 1952, Finkelnburg was a guest lecturer at the Catholic University of America. In 1952, he became a member of the research department, and in 1955, he became head of the department of reactor development. While at the university, he also worked for the Engineer Research and Development Laboratories, at nearby Fort Belvoir.

In 1963, Finkelnburg returned to Germany and took the position of general manager of the Siemens-Schuckert plant in Erlangen. From 1966 to 1967, he was also president of the Deutsche Physikalische Gesellschaft.

== Selected bibliography ==
=== Books ===
- Wolfgang Finkelnburg Kontinuierliche Spektren (Springer 1938)
- Wolfgang Finkelnburg Einführung in die Atomphysik (Springer-Verlag, 1948)
- Wolfgang Finkelnburg Hochstromkohlebogen. Physik und Technik einer Hochtemperatur-Bogenentladung (Springer, 1948)
- Wolfgang Finkelnburg 15 Sonderabdrucke 1934-47 [A collection of 15 articles by Wolfgang Finkelnburg published from 1934 to 1947]
- Wolfgang Finkelnburg Atomic Physics [International Series in Pure and Applied Physics] (McGraw-Hill, 1950)
- Wolfgang Finkelnburg Structure of Matter [Translated from the 9th/10th edition of Einführung in die Atomphysik by the author in cooperation with Dr. Ottlie Matossi-Riechemeier] (Academic Press, 1964)
- Wolfgang Finkelnburg Der Physiker von Wolfgang Finkelnburg (Verl. Moderne Industrie, 1967)

=== Articles ===
- W. Finkelnburg and W. Weizel Über das kontinuierliche Wasserstoffspektrum. Der Verlauf seiner Anregungsspannung und seine Deutung, Zeitschrift für Physik Volume 68, Numbers 9-10, 577-584 (September, 1931). Received: 23 February 1931. Affiliations: Finkelburg, Physikalisch-Chemischen Institut der Universität Berlin, Deutschland, and Weizel, Physikalischen Institut der Universität Rostock, Deutschland.
- W. Finkelnburg Über die Deutung der Hg Ar-Banden bei 2365 und 2285 Å und des Hg2-Bands bei 1690 Å, Zeitschrift für Physik Volume 81, Numbers 11-12, 781-784 (1933). The author is cited as being at the Institut für Theoretische Physik der Technischen Hochschule Karlsruhe, Karlsruhe. Article received: 15 February 1933.
- W. Finkelnburg Über die Spektren von van der Waals-Molekülen Zeitschrift für Physik Volume 96, Numbers 11-12, 699-713 (1935). The author is cited as being at the Institut für theoretische Physik, Karlsruhe. Article received: 27 July 1935.
- Wolfgang Finkelnburg Zur Theorie der Detonationsvorgänge, Annalen der Physik, Volume 418, Issue 2, 116-120 (1936)
- Wolfgang Finkelnburg Continuous Electron Radiation in Gas Discharges, Phys. Rev. Volume 45, Issue 5, 341 - 342 (1934). The author is cited as being at the Norman Bridge Laboratory of Physics, California Institute of Technology, as a Fellow of the Rockefeller Foundation. Received 3 February 1934.
- Wolfgang Finkelnburg Electrode Vapor Jets in Arc and Spark Discharges, Phys. Rev. Volume 74, Issue 2, 222 - 223 (1948). The author is cited as being at the Engineer Research and Development Laboratories, Fort Belvoir, Virginia. Received 3 June 1948.
- Wolfgang Finkelnburg A Theory of the Production of Electrode Vapor Jets by Sparks and Arcs, Phys. Rev. Volume 74, Issue 10, 1475 - 1477 (1948). The author is cited as being at the Engineer Research and Development Laboratories, Fort Belvoir, Virginia. Received 14 July 1948.
- Wolfgang Finkelnburg Ionization Potentials of Higher Atomic Ions, Phys. Rev. Volume 77, Issue 2, 304 - 304 (1950). The author is cited as being at the Engineer Research and Development Laboratories, Fort Belvoir, Virginia. Received 2 December 1949.
