= Georg Joos =

German experimental physicist (1894–1959)

Georg Jakob Christof Joos (25 May 1894 in Bad Urach, German Empire – 20 May 1959 in Munich, West Germany) was a German experimental physicist. He wrote Lehrbuch der theoretischen Physik, first published in 1932 and one of the most influential theoretical physics textbooks of the 20th Century.

== Education ==
Joos began his higher education in 1912 at the Technische Hochschule Stuttgart. He then went to study at the University of Tübingen, where he received his doctorate in 1920 under C. Füchtbauer.

== Career ==
After receipt of his doctorate, Joos became a teaching assistant to Jonathan Zenneck at the Technical University of Munich. In 1922, he became a Privatdozent there.

In 1924, he was appointed extraordinarius professor at the Friedrich Schiller University of Jena, where he lectured on the theory of electrons and the theory of relativity. In 1928, he was appointed ordinarius professor, as successor of Felix Auerbach. In the late 1920s, at the industrial firm Zeiss Jena, he reproduced the Michelson–Morley experiment with more refined equipment and confirmed the original results.

Before the publication of Arnold Sommerfeld's six-volume Vorlesungen über theoretische Physik in the 1940s, Lehrbuch der theoretischen Physik by Joos, first published in 1932, was probably one of the most important books on theoretical physics in the 20th Century.

In 1933, shortly after Adolf Hitler became Chancellor, the Law for the Restoration of the Professional Civil Service was passed, which resulted in resignations and emigrations of many Jewish physicists, one of them was James Franck, who was director of the Second Physics Institute at the University of Göttingen. In 1935, an ordinance related to the Civil Services act, the Law on the Retirement and Transfer of Professors as a Result of the Reorganization of the German System of Higher Education, was used to forcibly transfer Joos to Göttingen to fill Frank's position as ordinarius professor and director of the Second Physics Institute.

In the spring of 1936, Werner Heisenberg, Hans Geiger, and Max Wien sent a petition to the Reich Minister for Education at the Reichserziehungsministerium (REM, Reich Education Ministry). The petition was sent out of concern for the debilitating effects of the attacks on theoretical physics by the supporters of Deutsche Physik, which was both anti-Semitic and anti-theoretical physics, especially including quantum mechanics. Joos was a supporting signatory on the petition.

Based on the results of an experiment in which uranium was bombarded with neutrons, conducted in December 1938 by Otto Hahn and Fritz Strassmann at the Kaiser Wilhelm Institute for Chemistry, Hahn conveyed their results to his former colleague Lise Meitner. Meitner and her nephew, Otto Robert Frisch, correctly interpreted the data and coined the term fission. In April 1939, Joos, after hearing a paper by Wilhelm Hanle, conveyed to the Reichserziehungsministerium the implications of Hahn's experiment and the potential military applications of uranium research.

Due to the academic policies of the National Socialists in general, and specifically the Nationalsozialistischer Deutscher Dozentenbund (NSDDB, National Socialist German University Lecturers League) at universities, Joos departed academia in 1941. He became the chief physicist at Zeisswerke Jena, where he also participated on the management board. He remained there until shortly after the end of World War II, when, in September 1946, he was appointed as ordinarius professor of experimental physics and director of the physics department at the Technical University of Munich; he succeeded Rudolf Tomaschek, who had been suspended. For the academic years 1947 to 1949, Joos was visiting professor at Boston University.

== Jena, company Carl Zeiss and the Michelson-Morley Experiment ==
Joos became an associate professor in Jena in 1924 and a full professor in 1928. His textbook on theoretical physics, one of the most important of the 20th century, was published in 1932.

As early as 1925, Joos wrote in a letter to Sommerfeld that the Carl Zeiss company would build an apparatus for a Michelson-Morley experiment on the Jungfrau Joch. However, this was not realized. He received support for his project from Rudolf Straubel, managing director of the Zeiss factory in Jena. The structures for the experiment required a great deal of technical and construction effort. Under the direction of Franz Meyer, a design was developed that pushed the limits of what was possible at the time. The device was built in the astronomy workshop.

On May 10, 1930, the experiment was carried out in a basement room of the Carl Zeiss company in Jena. It is the experiment with the highest accuracy to date, which denies the existence of an ether wind and thus supports Albert Einstein's special theory of relativity. The setup for the experiment came to the German Museum in Munich in 1935. A small model of the experiment was used at the University of Jena in physics practicals until the 1960s.

== Internal report ==
The following was published in Kernphysikalische Forschungsberichte (Research Reports in Nuclear Physics), an internal publication of the German Uranverein. Reports in this publication were classified Top Secret, they had very limited distribution, and the authors were not allowed to keep copies. The reports were confiscated under the Allied Operation Alsos and sent to the United States Atomic Energy Commission for evaluation. In 1971, the reports were declassified and returned to Germany. The reports are available at the Karlsruhe Nuclear Research Center and the American Institute of Physics.

- Georg Joos Georg Joos to Army Ordinance G-46 (29 March 1940)

== Books ==
- Georg Joos, Ernst Angerer, and Johannes Stark Anregung der Spektren Spektroskopische Apparate und Starkeffekt (Akademische Verlagsgesellschaft mbH, 1927)
- Georg Joos Sammelband mit 3 Sonderdrucken aus dem Hb. der Experimentalphysik. (Akademische Verlagsgesellschaft, 1928–1929)
- Georg Joos Atome und Weltall. Ein Vortrag. (Student und Leben, Heft 3). (Jena, 1931)
- Georg Joos Lehrbuch der theoretischen Physik (Akademische Verlagsgesellschaft, 1932, 1934, 1939, 1942, 1943, 1945, 1950, 1954, 1954, 1956, 1959, 1964, 1964, 1964, 1965, 1980)
  - Georg Joos, author and Ira M. Freeman, translator Theoretical Physics (Hafner, 1934, 1950, 1957, 1958) (Blackie and Son, 1942, 1946, 1947, 1951, 1953, 1958) (Dover, 1986, 1987)
- Georg Joos and Theodor Kaluza Höhere Mathematik für den Praktiker (Barth, 1947, 1951, 1952, 1954, 1956, 1958, 1964)
- Geog Joos, editor Physik der festen Körper. I. (Dieterich'sche Verlagsbuchhandlung, 1947)
  - Georg Joos, editor Physics of Solids. Part I. [FIAT Review of German Science 1939–1946, Physics of Solids] (Office of Military Government for Germany Field Information Agencies, Technical, 1947)
- Geog Joos, editor Physik der festen Körper. II. (Dieterich'sche Verlagsbuchhandlung, 1948)
  - Georg Joos, editor Physics of Solids. Part II. [FIAT Review of German Science 1939–1946, Physics of Solids] (Office of Military Government for Germany Field Information Agencies, Technical, 1948)
