= Wiesbaden-Breckenheim =

Breckenheim
- Stadtteil of Wiesbaden
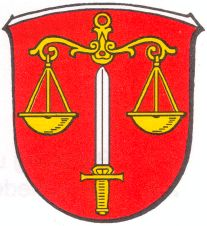
- Coat of arms

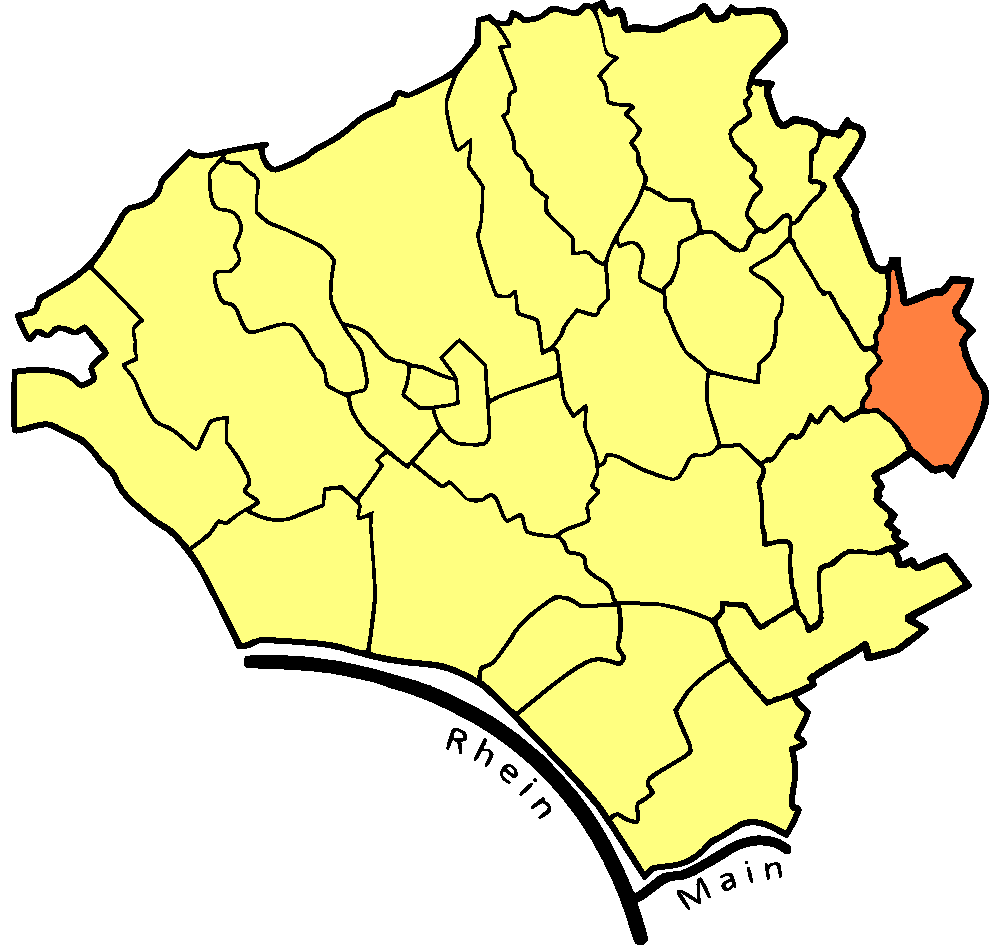
- Location of Breckenheim within Wiesbaden
- Interactive map of Breckenheim
- Location within Germany Location within Hesse
- Coordinates: 50°4′N 8°22′E
- Country: Germany
- State: Hesse
- Admin. region: Darmstadt
- District: Urban district
- City: Wiesbaden
- Elevation: 161 m (528 ft)

Population (2020-12-31)
  - Total: 3,332
- Time zone: UTC+01:00 (CET)
  - Summer (DST): UTC+02:00 (CEST)
- Postal codes: 65207
- Dialling codes: 06122
- Vehicle registration: WI
- Website: breckenheim.de

Breckenheim (German pronunciation: [ˈbʁɛkn̩haɪm]) is one of Wiesbaden's eastern suburbs, and was incorporated into the city of Wiesbaden on 1 January 1977. It has a population of about 3,300 (2020).

== History ==
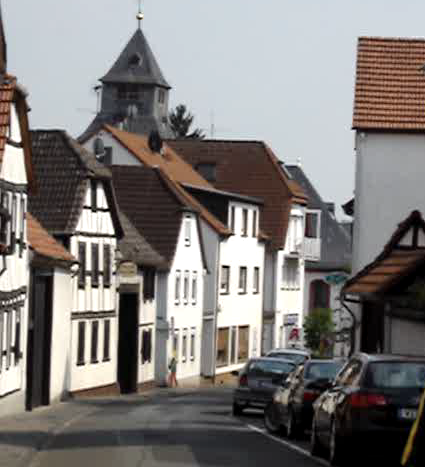
The Alte Dorfstraße with the Evangelische Church in background

The first known mention of Breckenheim is from a charter dated 1 May 950 in which King Otto I donates land in the Königssondergau in Breckenheim, nearby Wallau and Nordenstadt to the count Gerung. The document reads in Latin: "in villa Wanaloha et Brechenheim in pago Kunigessundera vocato in comitatu prefati Gerung comitis.

In the Middle Ages, the village and others surrounding belonged to the Lords of Eppstein from 1137. On 15 May 1251, the archbishop of Mainz donated several properties in Breckenheim and Erbenheim to the College of Mainz Cathedral. Of the extant buildings in Breckenheim, only the church tower, which was first mentioned in 1280, remains from this time. Breckenheim and other villages in the area were sold in 1492 to William III, the landgrave of Upper Hesse, and was passed to Hesse-Marburg in 1567, then in 1604 to Hesse-Kassel (or Hesse-Cassel), then to Hesse-Darmstadt in 1624. The church at the center of the old village was completed in 1724, replacing the original which was destroyed along with most of Breckenheim in the Thirty Years' War. In 1803, the village was passed to Nassau and in 1866 was annexed by Prussia.

== Sources ==
- Die Geschichte von Breckenheim. Source: Dr. Rolf Faber Accessed 12-21-2013
