= Karl Rohn =

German mathematician

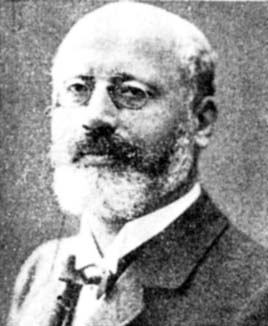
Karl Rohn

Karl Friedrich Wilhelm Rohn (25 January 1855 in Schwanheim – 4 August 1920 in Leipzig) was a German mathematician, who studied geometry.

== Life and work ==
Rohn studied in Darmstadt, Leipzig and Munich, initially engineering but then mathematics by the influence of Alexander von Brill, among the others. In 1878 he received a doctorate under the supervision of Felix Klein in Munich, and in 1879 he habilitated at Leipzig. The subject of his doctoral thesis and habilitation was the Kummer surfaces of order 4 and their relationship with hyperelliptic functions (with Riemann surfaces of genus 2). In 1884 he became an associate professor at the University of Leipzig and a year later at the Dresden University of Technology, where in 1887 he was a professor of descriptive geometry. In 1904 he became a professor at Leipzig.

In addition to the Kummer surfaces, he studied algebraic space curves and completed the classification work of Georges Halphen and Max Noether.

In 1913 he was the president of the German Mathematical Society.

== Writings ==
- Die verschiedenen Gestalten der Kummer'schen Fläche. In: Mathematische Annalen. 18. Band. Leipzig 1881, S. 99–159. (online)
- with Erwin Papperitz: Lehrbuch der Darstellenden Geometrie, 2 Bände, Leipzig 1893, 1896.
- with L. Berzolari: Algebraische Raumkurven und abwickelbare Flächen. In: Enzyklopädie der mathematischen Wissenschaften. Erschienen 1926. (online)
