= Bruno Thüring =

German physicist and astronomer

Bruno Jakob Thüring
- Born: September 7, 1905; Warmensteinach, Germany
- Died: May 6, 1989 (aged 83); Karlsruhe, Germany
- Education: Ludwig-Maximilians-Universität München
- Known for: involvement in Deutsche Physik
- Scientific career
- Fields: Physics; Astronomy
- Workplaces: Ludwig-Maximilians-Universität München; Heidelberg University; University of Vienna
- Doctoral advisor: Alexander Wilkens

Bruno Jakob Thüring (7 September 1905, in Warmensteinach – 6 May 1989, in Karlsruhe) was a German physicist and astronomer.

== Life and career ==
Thüring studied mathematics, physics, and astronomy at the Ludwig-Maximilians-Universität München and received his doctorate in 1928, under Alexander Wilkens. Wilkens was a professor of astronomy and director of the Munich Observatory, which was part of the university. From 1928 to 1933, Thüring was an assistant at the Munich Observatory. From 1934 to 1935, he was an assistant to Heinrich Vogt at Heidelberg University. Thüring completed his Habilitation there in 1935, whereupon he became an observator at the Munich Observatory. In 1937, Thüring became a lecturer (Dozent) at the Ludwig-Maximilians-Universität München. From 1940 to 1945, he held the chair for astronomy at the University of Vienna and was director of the Vienna Observatory. After 1945, Thüring lived as a private scholar in Karlsruhe.

During the reign of Adolf Hitler, Thüring was a proponent of Deutsche Physik, as were the two Nobel Prize-winning physicists Johannes Stark and Philipp Lenard; Deutsche Physik, was anti-Semitic and had a bias against theoretical physics, especially quantum mechanics. He was also a student of the philosophy of Hugo Dingler.

Thüring was an opponent of Albert Einstein's theory of relativity.

== Books ==
- Bruno Thüring Albert Einsteins Umsturzversuch der Physik (Georg Lüttke Verlag, 1941)
- Bruno Thüring Einführung in die Methoden der Programmierung kaufmännischer und wissenschaftlicher Probleme für elektronische Rechenanlagen. T. 1. Die Logik der Programmierung (Göller, 1957)
- Bruno Thüring Einführung in die Methoden der Programmierung kaufmännischer und wissenschaftlicher Probleme für elektronische Rechenanlagen. T. 2. Automatische Programmierung dargest. an d. Univac Fac-Tronic (Göller, 1958)
- Bruno Thüring Die Gravitation und die philosophischen Grundlagen der Physik (Duncker u. Humblot GmbH, 1967)
- Bruno Thüring Einführung in die Protophysik der Welle. Kymometrie (Duncker & Humblot GmbH, 1978)
- Bruno Thüring Methodische Kosmologie. Alternativen zur Expansion des Weltalls und zum Urknall (Haag u. Herchen, 1985)

== Sources ==
- Clark, Ronald W. Einstein: The Life and Times (World, 1971)
