= National Socialist German Lecturers League =

Nazi organization to control higher education (1935–1944)

- Nationalsozialistischer Deutscher Dozentenbund
- Predecessor: National Socialist Teachers League
- Founded: 1935
- Dissolved: 1944
- Location: Nazi Germany

The National Socialist German Lecturers League (Nationalsozialistischer Deutscher Dozentenbund, also called NS-Dozentenbund, or abbreviated NSDDB), was a party organization under the NSDAP (the Nazi Party).

== Origin and purpose ==
The NSDDB emerged in 1935 from the National Socialist Teachers League and was established on the basis of an order of the Deputy Führer Rudolf Hess; its purpose being, the exertion of influence on the universities and the political control of higher education. Massive influence was applied especially on appointments to staff positions. District leaders had a decisive role in the acceptance of an Habilitationsschrift, which was a prerequisite to attaining the rank of Privatdozent necessary to becoming a university lecturer. The expulsion of the Jewish scientists from the universities was substantially carried out by the activists of the Lecturers League.

== Leadership ==
In 1938 about a quarter of the German higher education faculty was associated with the Lecturers League. The share of Lecturer League members was particularly high in the humanities faculties. The leadership ranks in the Lecturers League were strikingly often members (or graduates) of the medical faculty.

Like all Nazi organizations, the NSDDB was set up according to the "leadership principle". From the emergence of the institution until June 1944, the "Reich Lecturers Leader" was the surgeon, Walter "Bubi" Schultze. For misconduct to the detriment of a party member he was relieved of his office in 1944 by the Nazi Party Court and replaced by "Reich Students Leader", Gustav Adolf Scheel. Scheel was likewise a physician.

Schultze made clear how he intended to carry out his authority, after taking office in 1935. First, he caused all party members among the higher education teachers to register. For senior positions, he let it be known, it was not enough only to wear a party badge on the lapel, one must also be capable of "forcing the opposition to the wall". Besides the partisan feelings, the recognizable determination and talent to educate the youth in the Nazi spirit, the "race question" should be above all a decisive factor in higher education. With his inauguration speech for the Reichsuniversität Straßburg, in November 1941, Schultze declared the highest aim of the college to be: "to eradicate" everything "un-German" from "our people's world of thought".

== Effectiveness ==
To anchor the national socialist ideology among the lecturers, four NS-Lecturer League scientific academies had already been set up. They were located at the Universities of Giessen, Göttingen, Kiel and Tübingen. The NSDDB's so-called "training camp" was a special kind of scientific education that was supposed to take the place of old-style conventions, and aimed at bringing the participants into line with the Nazi ideology.

The effectiveness of the Lecturers League was limited, for one thing, by the "office-holder confusion" typical of Nazism: the imprecise differentiation of the jurisdiction and competence of a position. The NSDDB most frequently clashed with the Amt Rosenberg, which laid equal claim on higher education policy as its domain. Deputy-Führer Hess was an ally of the NSDDB in these conflicts.

Another factor limiting the effectiveness of the NSDDB was the often low regard for its leaders at the universities. Many had a reputation of wanting to compensate for their lack of scientific standing and expertise by means of excessive partisan zeal.

Many educators and lecturers evaded the pressure to alter their work; so that overall, the League was largely ineffective. However, in the strongholds of Nazi teaching and research, such as Jena, Kiel and Königsberg, the League was more potent.

== Literature ==
- Wolfgang Benz; Hermann Graml; Hermann Weiß, eds. (2007). Enzyklopädie des Nationalsozialismus. Klett-Cotta. ISBN 9783423344081.
- Helmut Heiber: Universität unterm Hakenkreuz. Saur, München et al. 1991–1994, T. I: ISBN 3-598-22629-2; T. II, 1+2: ISBN 3-598-22628-4.
- Anne Christine Nagel; Ulrich Sieg (2000). Die Philipps-Universität Marburg im Nationalsozialismus: Dokumente zu ihrer Geschichte. Franz Steiner Verlag. pp. 46–55, 247–251, 326–327. ISBN 978-3-515-07653-1.
- Hentschel, Klaus, editor and Ann M. Hentschel, editorial assistant and Translator Physics and National Socialism: An Anthology of Primary Sources (Birkhäuser, 1996) ISBN 0-8176-5312-0
- John Connelly; Michael Grüttner, eds. (2005). Universities under dictatorship. University Park, PA: Pennsylvania State University Press. ISBN 9780271026954.
- Trott, Eckart (2007). Logic's lost genius : the life of Gerhard Gentzen. Providence, RI London: American Mathematical Society London Mathematical Society. ISBN 978-0821835500.
