= Philipp Lenard =

German physicist (1862–1947)

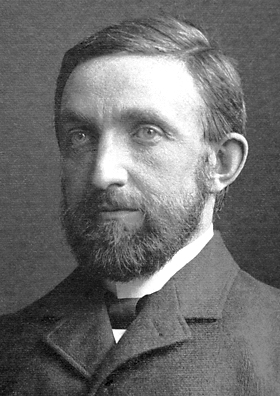
- Lenard in 1905
- Born: Philipp Eduard Anton von Lenard; 7 June 1862; Pozsony, Austrian Empire
- Died: 20 May 1947 (aged 84); Messelhausen, Germany
- Education: Heidelberg University: Dr. rer. nat., Physics; University of Bonn: Dr. habil., Physics
- Known for: Cathode rays; Photoelectric effect
- Political party: NSDAP (from 1937)
- Awards: Rumford Medal (1896); Matteucci Medal (1896); Nobel Prize in Physics (1905); Franklin Medal (1932)
- Scientific career
- Fields: Physics
- Workplaces: Heidelberg University; University of Bonn; University of Breslau; RWTH Aachen; Kiel University
- Thesis: Ueber die Schwingung fallender Tropfen (1886)
- Doctoral advisor: Georg Hermann Quincke
- Doctoral students: Edward Andrade; Walther Kossel

Philipp Eduard Anton von Lenard (German: [ˈfɪlɪp ˈleːnaʁt]; 7 June 1862 – 20 May 1947) was a German experimental physicist who received the Nobel Prize in Physics in 1905 for his work on cathode rays. This work led to his experimental realization of the photoelectric effect, discovering that the energy (speed) of the electrons ejected from a cathode depends only on the frequency and not the intensity of light.

As an active proponent of the Nazi ideology, Lenard supported Adolf Hitler in the 1920s and was an important role model for the Deutsche Physik movement during the Nazi period. He labeled Albert Einstein's contributions to theoretical physics as "Jewish physics".

== Biography ==
Philipp Eduard Anton von Lenard was born on 7 June 1862 in Pozsony (German: Pressburg; now Bratislava, Slovakia), Kingdom of Hungary, Austrian Empire, to German Hungarian parents, Antonie (née Baumann) and Philipp von Lenard, a wine merchant. His father's family had originally come from Tyrol, while his mother's family originated from Baden.

Lenard attended the Pozsonyi Királyi Katolikus Főgymnasium (Royal Catholic College of Pozsony, now Gamča), and as he records in his autobiography, this made a big impression on him (especially the personality of his teacher, Virgil Klatt). He studied physics and chemistry for one year in Budapest and Vienna, before returning to Pozsony in 1882 to work in his father's business. In 1883, he began studying physics under Robert Bunsen and Georg Hermann Quincke at Heidelberg University, interrupted by one semester in Berlin in 1885. He received a doctorate in 1886, and stayed at Heidelberg as an assistant to Quincke until 1889. He went to the University of Bonn in 1891, where he completed his habilitation in 1892 under Heinrich Hertz. He then became a Privatdozent and an assistant to Hertz.

Lenard was Professor Extraordinary at the University of Breslau (1894–1895), Professor of Physics at RWTH Aachen (1895–1896), and Professor of Theoretical Physics at Heidelberg University (1896–1898). In 1898, he was appointed Professor Ordinarius at Kiel University. In 1907, he became Director of the Institute for Physics and Radiology at Heidelberg, where he remained until his retirement in 1931.

Lenard died on 20 May 1947 in Messelhausen at the age of 84.

== Research ==
=== Cathode rays ===
Lenard's major contribution to physics was in the study of cathode rays, which he began in 1888. Prior to his work, cathode rays were produced in primitive, partially evacuated glass tubes that had metallic electrodes in them, across which a high voltage could be placed. Cathode rays were difficult to study using this arrangement, because they were inside sealed glass tubes, difficult to access, and because the rays were in the presence of air molecules. He overcame these problems by devising a method of making small metallic windows in the glass that were thick enough to be able to withstand the pressure differences, but thin enough to allow passage of the rays. Having made a window for the rays, he could pass them out into the laboratory, or, alternatively, into another chamber that was completely evacuated. These windows have come to be known as Lenard windows. He was able to conveniently detect the rays and measure their intensity by means of paper sheets coated with phosphorescent and materials. In particular, he came to use pentadecylparatolylketone, which was very effective as a cathode ray detector but, unfortunately for Lenard, not fluorescent in X-rays. When Wilhelm Röntgen set out to reproduce Lenard's results, he was forced to use barium platinocyanide instead because Lenard had purchased all the available pentadecyl-para-tolyl ketone. The alternative was sensitive to both UV and X-rays allowing Röntgen to discover X-rays.

Lenard observed that the absorption of cathode rays was, to first order, proportional to the density of the material they were made to pass through. This appeared to contradict the idea that they were some sort of electromagnetic radiation. He also showed that the rays could pass through some inches of air of a normal density, and appeared to be scattered by it, implying that they must be particles that were even smaller than the molecules in air. He confirmed some of J. J. Thomson's work, which eventually arrived at the understanding that cathode rays were streams of negatively charged energetic particles. He called them quanta of electricity or for short quanta, after Helmholtz, while Thomson proposed the name "corpuscles", but eventually electrons became the everyday term. In conjunction with his and other earlier experiments on the absorption of the rays in metals, the general realization that electrons were constituent parts of the atom enabled him to claim correctly that for the most part atoms consist of empty space. He proposed that every atom consists of empty space and electrically neutral corpuscules called "dynamids", each consisting of an electron and an equal positive charge.

Lenard window tube labeled

As a result of his Crookes tube investigations, he showed that the rays produced by irradiating metals in a vacuum with ultraviolet light were similar in many respects to cathode rays. His most important observation was that the energy of the rays in the photoelectric effect was independent of the light intensity. His interpretation however imagined that the light released rays already moving inside of atoms and he made no connection between the energy of the light and the electron.

These latter observations were explained by Albert Einstein as a quantum effect. Each quantum of light with sufficient energy resulted in one photoelectron, so the light intensity affected the electron flux intensity but not its energy. This theory predicted that the plot of the cathode ray energy versus the frequency would be a straight line with a slope equal to the Planck constant, h. This was shown to be the case some years later. The photoelectric quantum theory was the work cited when Einstein was awarded the Nobel Prize in Physics in 1921. Suspicious of the general adulation of Einstein, he became a prominent skeptic of relativity and of Einstein's theories generally; he did not, however, dispute Einstein's explanation of the photoelectric effect. Lenard grew extremely resentful of the credit accorded to Wilhelm Röntgen, who received the first Nobel Prize in Physics in 1901 for the discovery of X-rays. Lenard wrote that he, not Röntgen, was the "mother of the X-rays", since he had invented the apparatus used to produce them; Lenard likened Röntgen's role to that of a "midwife" who merely assists with the birth.

=== Meteorological contributions ===
Lenard was the first person to study what has been termed the Lenard effect in 1892. This is the separation of electric charges accompanying the aerodynamic breakup of water drops. It is also known as spray electrification or the waterfall effect.

Lenard conducted studies on the size and shape distributions of raindrops and constructed a novel wind tunnel in which water droplets of various sizes could be held stationary for a few seconds. He was the first to recognize that large raindrops are not tear-shaped, but are rather shaped something like a hamburger bun.

== Deutsche Physik ==
Lenard is remembered today as a strong German nationalist who despised "English physics", which he considered to have stolen its ideas from Germany. Lenard and fellow experimental physicist Johannes Stark were increasingly sidelined and ignored in the 1920's due to their rejection of the theory of relativity and of quantum mechanics. During the Nazi regime, he was the outspoken proponent of the idea that Germany should rely on "Deutsche Physik" and ignore what he considered the fallacious and deliberately misleading ideas of "Jewish physics", by which he meant chiefly the theories of Albert Einstein, including "the Jewish fraud" of relativity (see also criticism of the theory of relativity). Lenard became Chief of Aryan Physics under the Nazis. In his foreword to his four volume science textbook Deutsche Physik he argued that like everything that man creates, science is determined by race.

Lenard's book, Great Men in Science, A History of Scientific Progress, first published in English in 1933, claimed these men were all "Aryan scientists". The individual scientists selected for inclusion by Lenard do not include Einstein or Marie Curie, nor any other twentieth-century scientist. The publisher of the 1954 English edition included on page xix what now appears to be a remarkable understatement: "While Professor Lenard's studies of the men of science who preceded him showed not only profound knowledge but also admirable balance, when it came to men of his own time he was apt to let his own strong views on contemporary matters sway his judgment. In his lifetime he would not consent to certain modifications that were proposed in the last study of the series."

The ideologists of Nazism in Germany argued that the theory of relativity was inextricably linked to materialism and Marxism. The most notable of them was Lenard. Lenard had become the head of Deutsche Physik ("Aryan physics"), a philosophy of science that dismissed the contributions of Albert Einstein and other Jewish physicists as "Jewish physics". Einstein had discovered the mechanism of the photoelectric effect, which Lenard had detected experimentally but could not explain theoretically.

Lenard called Einstein's theories "Jewish fraud". Lenard especially hated physics based on advanced mathematics. Lenard, in particular, and in general the experimental physicists of that time did not understand advanced mathematics. They described their laboratory observations in prose rather than mathematically.

== Awards ==
Year	Organization	Award	Co-recipients	Citation	Ref.
1896	Royal Society	Rumford Medal	Wilhelm Röntgen	"For their investigations of the phenomena produced outside a highly exhausted tube through which an electrical discharge is taking place."	
1896	Accademia dei XL	Matteucci Medal	Wilhelm Röntgen	—	
1905	Royal Swedish Academy of Sciences	Nobel Prize in Physics	—	"For his work on cathode rays."	
1932	Franklin Institute	Franklin Medal	—	"For research of cathode rays and photo-electricity."	

== Commemoration ==
Helmholtz-Gymnasium Heidelberg had been named the Philipp Lenard Schule from 1927 until 1945, when it was renamed by the Mayor of Heidelberg as part of the denazification process.

Lenard crater near the north pole of the Moon was named in his honor from 2005 (approved in 2008) until 2020. When the International Astronomical Union learned of Lenard's Nazi connection, they decided to drop the name.

== Cultural references ==
- Lenard's criticism of the theory of relativity and his crusade against Einstein and his theories was covered in an episode of Dark Matters: Twisted But True, in a segment entitled "Einstein's Revenge".
- The life of Lenard and the interrelationship between his work and that of Albert Einstein is the subject of the book The Man Who Stalked Einstein: How Nazi Scientist Philipp Lenard Changed the Course of History by Bruce J. Hillman, Birgit Ertl-Wagner and Bernd C. Wagner.
- Lenard was portrayed by actor Michael McElhatton in the 2017 National Geographic anthology period drama television series Genius.
- Lenard featured as the villain in the seventh episode of Super Science Friends.

== Bibliography ==
- Lenard, Philipp (1906). Über Kathodenstrahlen (On Cathode Rays) (in German).
- Lenard, Philipp. Über Aether und Materie (On Aether and Matter) (in German).
- Lenard, Philipp (1914). Probleme komplexer Moleküle (Problems of complex molecules) (in German).
- Lenard, Philipp (1918). Quantitatives über Kathodenstrahlen (in German).
- Lenard, Philipp (1918). Über das Relativitätsprinzip (On the Principle of Relativity) (in German).
- Lenard, Philipp (1921). Aether und Uraether (in German).
- Lenard, Philipp (1930). Grosse Naturforscher (in German).
- Lenard, Philipp (1931) (in German). Erinnerungen eines Naturforschers. New edition: Erinnerungen eines Naturforschers – Kritische annotierte Ausgabe des Originaltyposkriptes von 1931/1843 (Arne Schirrmacher, ed.). Springer Verlag, Heidelberg 2010, 344 pages, ISBN 978-3-540-89047-8, e-ISBN 978-3-540-89048-5.
- Lenard, Philipp (1933). Great Men of Science. London: G. Bell and sons. OCLC 1156317.
- Lenard, Philipp (1936). Deutsche Physik in vier Bänden (in German). J.F. Lehmann. OCLC 13814543. 1. Einleitung und Mechanik, 2. Akustik und Wärmelehre, 3. Optik, Elektrostatik und Anfänge der Elektrodynamik (or: 3. Optik und Elektrizitätslehre 1. Teil), 4. Magnetismus, Elektrodynamik und Anfänge von weiterem (or: Elektrizitätslehre 2. Teil). Later editions, 1943

== See also ==
- Triode
- Fluid thread breakup
