= Academic ranks in Germany =

Academic ranks in Germany are the titles, relative importance and power of professors, researchers, and administrative personnel held in academia.

== Overview ==
	Faculty	Teaching only	Part-time
Permanent positions	Universitätsprofessor (Pay grade: W3 or W2), Professor (W3)	Lehrprofessor	Honorarprofessor
Permanent positions	Professor (W2)	Lehrprofessor	Honorarprofessor
Permanent positions	Professor (W1), Akademischer Oberrat, Akademischer Rat, Wissenschaftlicher / Akademischer Mitarbeiter (tenured)	Lehrkraft für besondere Aufgaben (LfbA) (tenured), (Ober-)Studienrat i.H. (im Hochschuldienst: School teacher in academic teaching function, for example for courses in Latin or Ancient Greek)	Honorarprofessor
Temporary positions	Akademischer Rat auf Zeit, Akademischer Oberrat auf Zeit (AR/AOR a.Z.), Juniorprofessor (W1 non-tenured), Professor auf Zeit (W2 non-tenured)	Lehrkraft für besondere Aufgaben (LfbA) (non-tenured)	Lehrbeauftragter
Temporary positions	Wissenschaftlicher Mitarbeiter (graduate student)	Lehrkraft für besondere Aufgaben (LfbA) (non-tenured)	Lehrbeauftragter
Temporary positions	Wissenschaftliche Hilfskraft (undergraduate student)	Lehrkraft für besondere Aufgaben (LfbA) (non-tenured)	Lehrbeauftragter

Appointment grades

- Universitätsprofessor (Pay grade: W3 or W2)
- Professor (W3)
- Professor (W2)
- Hochschuldozent (W2, only in Baden-Württemberg) – although paid like a professor appointed at level W2, lecturers in this position do not have a professor title; the term was formerly used in all states for senior lecturer positions with research and teaching responsibilities (C2, being phased out since 2002)
- Juniorprofessor (not tenured, but increasingly with tenure track) (W1)
- Juniordozent (not tenured) (W1, only in Baden-Württemberg)
- Studienrat or Akademischer Rat/Oberrat/Direktor auf Lebenszeit (A13, A14, A15)
- Wissenschaftlicher Mitarbeiter (TVöD 13/14/15, TvL 13/14/15)
- Wissenschaftlicher Mitarbeiter auf Zeit, Akademischer Rat auf Zeit (TVöD, TvL A13 a. Z.)
- Akademischer Mitarbeiter auf Zeit (TVöD, only in Baden-Württemberg)
- Wissenschaftliche Hilfskraft (TdL)
- Studentische Hilfskraft (TdL)

Non-appointment grades

- Privatdozent
- Außerplanmäßiger Professor – conferred, in some German states, to a Privatdozent who has been in scientific service for several years, without formally being employed or paid.

Administrative ranks

- Rektor, Präsident – rector or president, highest representative of the university or Polytechnic, elected
- Prorektor, Konrektor, Vizepräsident – prorector or vice president, responsible for a certain field, elected
- Kanzler – chancellor, administrative head, elected, longterm or even permanent position
- Referent – either a senior adviser for a special strategic field or head of a strategically important administrative unit above director level, serves as an interface between the senior leadership of the university and other university units
- Dekan – dean, head of a faculty, elected
- Prodekan – vice dean, responsible for a certain field
- Dekanatsrat – senior administrative officer carrying out tasks of an assistant dean
- Institutsdirektor – head of department, elected

== Faculty ==
In the 20th century, after their doctorate, German scholars who wished to go into academia usually worked towards a Habilitation by writing a second thesis, known as the Habilitationsschrift. This was often accomplished while employed as a Wissenschaftlicher Mitarbeiter or Wissenschaftlicher Assistent ("scientific assistant", E13) or in a non-tenured position as Akademischer Rat ("assistant professor/lecturer", both 3+3 years teaching and research positions). Once the scholar pass their Habilitation, they could work as Privatdozent and are eligible for a call to a chair.

Since 2002 alternative paths can also lead to a full professorship. One can reach a professorship at a university by habilitation, a successful evaluation as a junior professorship (after 5 years), a tenure track period (6 years) or equivalent performance. In engineering this is often attained through expert knowledge in the industry, and in natural science often by the number and quality of publications. While universities and Fachhochschulen ("Universities of Applied Sciences") do not have the same legal status, there are no formal differences in academic ranks except a higher teaching load in the Fachhochschulen as they have no research mandate. Since a new salary scheme was introduced in 2005, both types of universities can appoint W2 as well as W3 professors. In general, a professor at a Fachhochschule has not gone through the process of habilitation or junior professorship; depending on the federal state’s law and the status of the Fachhochschule they can or cannot supervise dissertations. Instead, a doctorate and at least three years of work experience in research and development outside academia are required. Usually, a professor at a university of applied science is more focused on teaching while a professor at a traditional university is more focused on research.

In Germany it has been debated whether Professor is a title that one may retain for life once it has been conferred (similar to the doctorate), or whether it is linked to an office and ceases to belong to the holder once the professor quits or retires (except in the usual case of becoming Professor emeritus). The latter view has won the day—although in many German states, there is a minimum requirement of five years of service before "Professor" may be kept as a title—and is by now both the law and majority opinion.

=== Main positions ===
- Professor (Prof.): Since about 2002 the standard title for full professors at universities in Germany.
- Professor ordinarius (ordentlicher Professor, o. Prof., Univ. Prof.): professor with chair, representing the branch of science in question. In Germany, it was common to call these positions in colloquial use "C4" professorships, due to the name of the respective entry in the official salary table for Beamte (civil servant). (Following recent reforms of the salary system at universities, one might find now the denomination "W3 professor.") Today in most German federal states this title is obsolete for restaffing. Since 2002 all full professors at universities and applied universities are called "professor".
- Professor extraordinarius ("extraordinary professor", außerordentlicher Professor, ao. Prof.): professor without chair, often in a side-area, or being associated with a professor with a chair. In many states of Germany this is a special title, which gives full rights as for a full professor (such as supervision of PhD and habilitation, participation in all professorial meetings, right for a special opinion for a dissertation in its field of specialization etc. etc.). These positions are tenured and typically paid according to the W2 salary scale. In Prussia before the First World War, the average salary of full professors ("Ordinarius") was double that of associate professors and up to nine times that of professors at the beginning of their careers.
- Professor emeritus (Prof. em.): just like in North America (see above); used both for the ordinarius and for the extraordinarius, although strictly speaking only the former is entitled to be addressed in this way. Although retired and being paid a pension instead of a salary, a Prof. em. may still teach, give exams and often still have an office.
- Junior Professor (Jun.-Prof.): this position started in 2002 in Germany, this is a 6-year time-limited professorship for inexperienced young scholars without Habilitation. It is supposed to rejuvenate those who are eventually supposed to become professors ordinarius in other institutions. The concept is intensely debated due to a lack of experience with this new approach. The main criticism is that Juniorprofessors are expected to apply for professorships at other universities during the latter part of the six-year period, as their universities should not offer tenure themselves (unlike in the tenure track schemes used, e.g., in the USA). The number of academics appointed as 'junior professors' in Germany has risen from ca. 900 in 2008 to ca. 1600 in 2014. Increasingly, the junior professorship is replaced by the tenure track model similar to that in the US, where a scholar without habilitation is hired and will get tenure (W2 or W3) after successful evaluation.

=== Other positions ===
- Honorarprofessor (Hon.-Prof.): equivalent to the Dutch Extraordinary Professor, non-salaried. An honorary title (not related to any sort of honorarium) conferred upon the person by a university for particular merits, often earned outside university or through long-term commitments (e.g., continued teaching) at the institution that confers the title. A Hon.-Prof. is obligated to lecture on a small scale. However, this is sometimes circumvented by title holders, especially since the title became popular among executives.
- außerplanmäßiger Professor (apl. Prof. or Prof.): either a tenured university lecturer or a former Privatdozent to whom the title is awarded after a time during which she or he has done excellent research. The word außerplanmäßig (supernumerary) literally means "outside of the plan" and denotes that no pay is associated with the position (apl. Prof. might be employed as researchers with the university, however, but they might also be employed outside of the university system). As a member of the faculty they are obligated to lecture and conduct examinations and have the right to supervise doctoral theses.
- Privatdozent (Priv.-Doz. or PD): a member of a faculty who has passed the Habilitation; this title may also be awarded to a former Juniorprofessor and - in terms of academic achievement - is comparable to that of Associate Professor (North America), Senior Lecturer (United Kingdom), or maître de conférences (France). A Privatdozent is obligated to lecture and conduct examinations (often without pay) in order to keep the title and is allowed to supervise doctoral theses.
- Lehrbeauftragter: a paid part-time (for example 2 hrs per week in a semester) teaching position for scientists in general with non university position who often hold a doctorate; Lehrbeauftragter is sometimes comparable with an adjunct assistant professor or an adjunct associate professor (US). It is not considered a professor position in Germany.
- Vertretungsprofessor: is an interim professor who officially represents a vacant chair or professorship for a limited amount of time, mostly 1 or 2 semesters. Very often a completed Habilitation is required. It is comparable with visiting associate professor (US). Some academics use this job as a changeover position before getting this particular job in a tenured way or before getting a tenured professorship at another institution.
- Gastprofessor: A visiting scholar. If they lecture they are sometimes also called a visiting professor. Further, a visiting scholar can also work as a Vertretungsprofessor.
- Seniorprofessor (distinguished senior professorship): A special arrangement where a professor close to retirement is freed from the requirement to lecture and does only research. Their salary is already paid from the pension fund, as if they retired early, and part of their previous regular salary is often used to hire a young successor to gradually take over the Seniorprofessor's work.

=== Other professors ===
Some other uses of the title professor:

- Employment title outside the universities: In Germany, some civil servants like directors of certain public museums or research-oriented public institutions bear an employment title which contains the word 'Professor'. Examples: "Präsident und Professor des Bundesinstituts für Risikobewertung" ("President and Professor of the Federal Institute for Risk Assessment"), "Präsident und Professor der Stiftung Deutsches Historisches Museum" ("President and Professor of the Foundation German Historic Museum").
- Gymnasialprofessor (Professor at Gymnasium): In some German states, senior teachers at Gymnasium, which is a type of secondary school, were also designated Professor in the late 19th and early 20th century. In Austria, tenured teachers at Gymnasium are still called Professor.

== In other countries ==
Similar or identical systems as in Germany (where a Habilitation is required) are in place, e.g., in Austria, the German-speaking part of Switzerland (however in Switzerland the term is used as a more general honorary title in the Universities of Applied Sciences, the Fachhochschulen), as well as in Poland, Slovakia, Hungary and Slovenia.

In Poland, professor is an academic degree required to obtain the position of full (ordinary) professor. An extraordinary professorship is lower ranked, and does not require the professor title.

In some countries using the German-style academic system (e.g. Austria, Finland, Sweden), Professor is also an honorific title that can be bestowed upon an artist, scholar, etc., by the President or by the government, completely independent of any actual academic post or assignment.

== See also ==
- Academic degree § Germany
- Civil service in Germany
