= Johannes Stark =

German physicist (1874–1957)

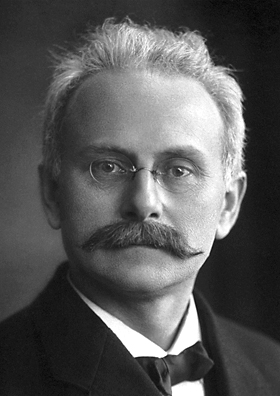
- Stark in 1919
- Born: 15 April 1874; Schickenhof, Kingdom of Bavaria, German Empire
- Died: 21 June 1957 (aged 83); Traunstein, Bavaria, West Germany
- Education: Ludwig-Maximilians-Universität München (Dr. phil.)
- Known for: Stark effect Stark–Einstein law
- Movement: Deutsche Physik
- Spouse: Luise Uepler
- Children: 5
- Scientific career
- Fields: Physics
- Workplaces: University of Göttingen; Königliche Technische Hochschule; Technische Hochschule Aachen; University of Greifswald; University of Würzburg; Physikalisch-Technische Reichsanstalt
- Thesis: Untersuchung über einige physikalische, vorzüglich optische Eigenschaften des Rußes (1897)
- Doctoral advisor: Eugen von Lommel

Johannes Stark (German: [joˈhanəs ˈʃtaʁk]; 15 April 1874 – 21 June 1957) was a German physicist who received the Nobel Prize in Physics in 1919 for his discovery of the Stark effect.

A supporter of Adolf Hitler from 1924, Stark was one of the main figures, along with fellow Nobel laureate Philipp Lenard, in the antisemitic Deutsche Physik movement, which sought to remove Jewish physicists from German institutions. In 1947, he was found guilty as a "Major Offender" by a denazification court, but this was reduced to "Lesser Offender" in 1949 after appeal.

== Education ==
Johannes Stark was born on 15 April 1874 in Schickenhof (now part of Freihung), Germany.

Stark was educated at the Gymnasium in Bayreuth, and later in Regensburg. In 1894, he entered the Ludwig-Maximilians-Universität München, where he studied physics, mathematics, chemistry, and crystallography. In 1897, he received his Ph.D. in Physics with a thesis, written under Eugen von Lommel, titled Untersuchungen über einige physikalische, vorzüglich optische Eigenschaften des Russes (Investigations into some physical, especially optical, properties of soot). Stark stayed at the Ludwig-Maximilians-Universität München as an assistant to von Lommel until 1900.

== Career and research ==
In 1900, Stark became a Privatdozent at the University of Göttingen. In 1906, he was appointed Extraordinary Professor at Königliche Technische Hochschule in Hanover, and in 1909 became Professor at RWTH Aachen University. From 1917 to 1922, he worked as a professor at the University of Greifswald and the University of Würzburg.

In 1919, Stark was awarded the Nobel Prize in Physics "for his discovery of the Doppler effect in canal rays and the splitting of spectral lines in electric fields" (the latter is known as the Stark effect).

From 1933 until his retirement in 1939, Stark was President of the Physikalisch-Technische Reichsanstalt, while also President of the Notgemeinschaft der Deutschen Wissenschaft.

It was Stark who, as the editor of the Jahrbuch der Radioaktivität und Elektronik, asked in 1907, then still rather unknown, Albert Einstein to write a review article on the principle of relativity. Stark seemed impressed by relativity and Einstein's earlier work when he quoted "the principle of relativity formulated by H. A. Lorentz and A. Einstein" and "Planck's relationship M_{0} = E_{0}/c^{2}" in his 1907 paper in Physikalische Zeitschrift, where he used the equation e_{0} = m_{0}c^{2} to calculate an "elementary quantum of energy", i.e. the amount of energy related to the mass of an electron at rest. While working on his article, Einstein began a line of thought that would eventually lead to his general theory of relativity, which in turn became (after its confirmation) the start of Einstein's worldwide fame. This is ironic, given Stark's later work as an anti-Einstein and anti-relativity propagandist in the Deutsche Physik movement.

Stark published more than 300 papers, mainly regarding electricity and other such topics.

== Affiliation with Nazism ==
From 1924 onwards, Stark supported Hitler. During the Nazi regime, Stark attempted to become the Führer of German physics through the Deutsche Physik (Aryan Physics) movement (along with fellow Nobel laureate Philipp Lenard) against the "Jewish physics" of Albert Einstein and Werner Heisenberg (who was not Jewish). After Werner Heisenberg defended Albert Einstein's theory of relativity, Stark wrote an angry article in the official SS newspaper Das Schwarze Korps, calling Heisenberg a "White Jew".

On August 21, 1934, Stark wrote to physicist and fellow Nobel laureate Max von Laue, telling him to toe the party line or suffer the consequences. The letter was signed off with "Heil Hitler."

In his 1934 book, Nationalsozialismus und Wissenschaft (National Socialism and Science), Stark maintained that the priority of the scientist was to serve the nation—thus, the important fields of research were those that could help German arms production and industry. He attacked theoretical physics as "Jewish" and stressed that scientific positions in Nazi Germany should only be held by pure-blooded Germans.

Writing in Das Schwarze Korps, Stark argued that even if racial antisemitism were to triumph, it would only be a 'partial victory' if 'Jewish' ideas were not similarly defeated: "We also have to eradicate the Jewish spirit, whose blood can flow just as undisturbed today as before if its carriers hold beautiful Aryan passes".

In 1947, following the defeat of Germany in World War II, Stark was classified as a "Major Offender" and received a sentence of four years' imprisonment (later suspended) by a denazification court. This verdict was modified in 1949 by the Appelate Tribunal in Munich, reducing the sentence to "Lesser Offender" and a fine of 1000 marks.

== Personal life and death ==
Stark married Luise Uepler, with whom he had five children. His hobbies were the cultivation of fruit trees and forestry. He worked in his private laboratory, which he set up using his Nobel Prize money, on his country estate in Upper Bavaria after the Second World War. There, he studied the deflection of light in an electric field.

Stark spent the last years of his life on his estate (called Gut Eppenstatt) near Traunstein in Upper Bavaria, where he died on 21 June 1957 at the age of 83. He is buried at the mountain cemetery in Schönau am Königssee.

== Awards and honors ==
In addition to the Nobel Prize, Stark received various awards, including the Baumgartner Prize of the Vienna Academy of Sciences (1910), the Vahlbruch Prize of the Göttingen Academy of Sciences (1914), and the Matteucci Medal of the Rome Academy. In 1970, the International Astronomical Union honored him with a crater on the far-side of the Moon, without knowing about his Nazi activities. The name was dropped on August 12, 2020.

== Publications ==
- Die Entladung der Elektricität von galvanisch glühender Kohle in verdünntes Gas. (Sonderabdruck aus 'Annalen der Physik und Chemie', Neue Folge, Band 68). Leipzig, 1899
- Der elektrische Strom zwischen galvanisch glühender Kohle und einem Metall durch verdünntes Gas. (Sonderabdruck aus 'Annalen der Physik und Chemie', Neue Folge, Band 68). Leipzig, 1899
- Aenderung der Leitfähigkeit von Gasen durch einen stetigen elektrischen Strom. (Sonderabdruck aus 'Annalen der Physik', 4. Folge, Band 2). Leipzig, 1900
- Ueber den Einfluss der Erhitzung auf das elektrische Leuchten eines verdünnten Gases. (Sonderabdruck aus 'Annalen der Physik', 4. Folge, Band 1). Leipzig, 1900
- Ueber elektrostatische Wirkungen bei der Entladung der Elektricität in verdünnten Gasen. (Sonderabdruck aus 'Annalen der Physik', 4. Folge, Band 1). Leipzig, 1900
- Kritische Bemerkungen zu der Mitteilung der Herren Austin und Starke über Kathodenstrahlreflexion. Sonderabdruck aus 'Verhandlungen der Deutschen Physikalischen Gesellschaft', Jahrgang 4, Nr. 8). Braunschweig, 1902
- Prinzipien der Atomdynamik. 1. Teil. Die elektrischen Quanten., 1910
- Schwierigkeiten für die Lichtquantenhypothese im Falle der Emission von Serienlinien. (Sonderabdruck aus 'Verhandlungen der Deutschen Physikalischen Gesellschaft', Jg. XVI, Nr 6). Braunschweig, 1914
- Bemerkung zum Bogen – und Funkenspektrum des Heliums. (Sonderabdruck aus 'Verhandlungen der Deutschen Physikalischen Gesellschaft.', Jg. XVI, Nr. 10). Braunschweig, 1914
- Folgerungen aus einer Valenzhypothese. III. Natürliche Drehung der Schwingungsebene des Lichtes. (Sonderabdruck aus `Jahrbuch der Radioaktivität und Elektronik', Heft 2, Mai 1914), Leipzig, 1914
- Methode zur gleichzeitigen Zerlegung einer Linie durch das elektrische und das magnetische Feld. (Sonderabdruck aus 'Verhandlungen der Deutschen Physikalischen Gesellschaft.', Jg. XVI, Nr. 7). Braunschweig, 1914
- Die gegenwärtige Krise der deutschen Physik, ("The Thoroughgoing Crisis in German Physics") 1922
- Natur der chemischen Valenzkräfte, 1922
- Hitlergeist und Wissenschaft, 1924 together with Philipp Lenard
- Die Axialität der Lichtemission und Atomstruktur, Berlin 1927
- Atomstruktur und Atombindung, A. Seydel, Berlin 1928
- Atomstrukturelle Grundlagen der Stickstoffchemie., Leipzig, 1931
- Nationalsozialismus und Katholische Kirche, ("National Socialism and the Catholic Church") 1931
- Nationalsozialismus und Katholische Kirche. II. Teil: Antwort auf Kundgebungen der deutschen Bischöfe., 1931
- Nationale Erziehung, 1932
- Nationalsozialismus und Wissenschaft ("National Socialism and Science") 1934
- Stark, J. (1938). "The Pragmatic and the Dogmatic Spirit in Physics". Nature. 141 (3574): 770–772. Bibcode:1938Natur.141..770S. doi:10.1038/141770a0.
- Physik der Atomoberfläche, 1940
- Jüdische und deutsche Physik, ("Jewish and German Physics") with Wilhelm Müller, written at the Ludwig-Maximilians-Universität München in 1941
- Nationale Erziehung, Zentrumsherrschaft und Jesuitenpolitik, undated
- Hitlers Ziele und Persönlichkeit ("Hitler's Aims and Personality"), undated
