= Wave speed =

Wave speed is a wave property, which may refer to absolute value of:

- phase velocity, the velocity at which a wave phase propagates at a certain frequency
- group velocity, the propagation velocity for the envelope of wave groups and often of wave energy, different from the phase velocity for dispersive waves
- signal velocity, or information velocity, which is the velocity at which a wave carries information
- front velocity, the velocity at which the first rise of a pulse above zero moves forward
