= Bow wave =

Wave that forms at the bow of a ship moving through water

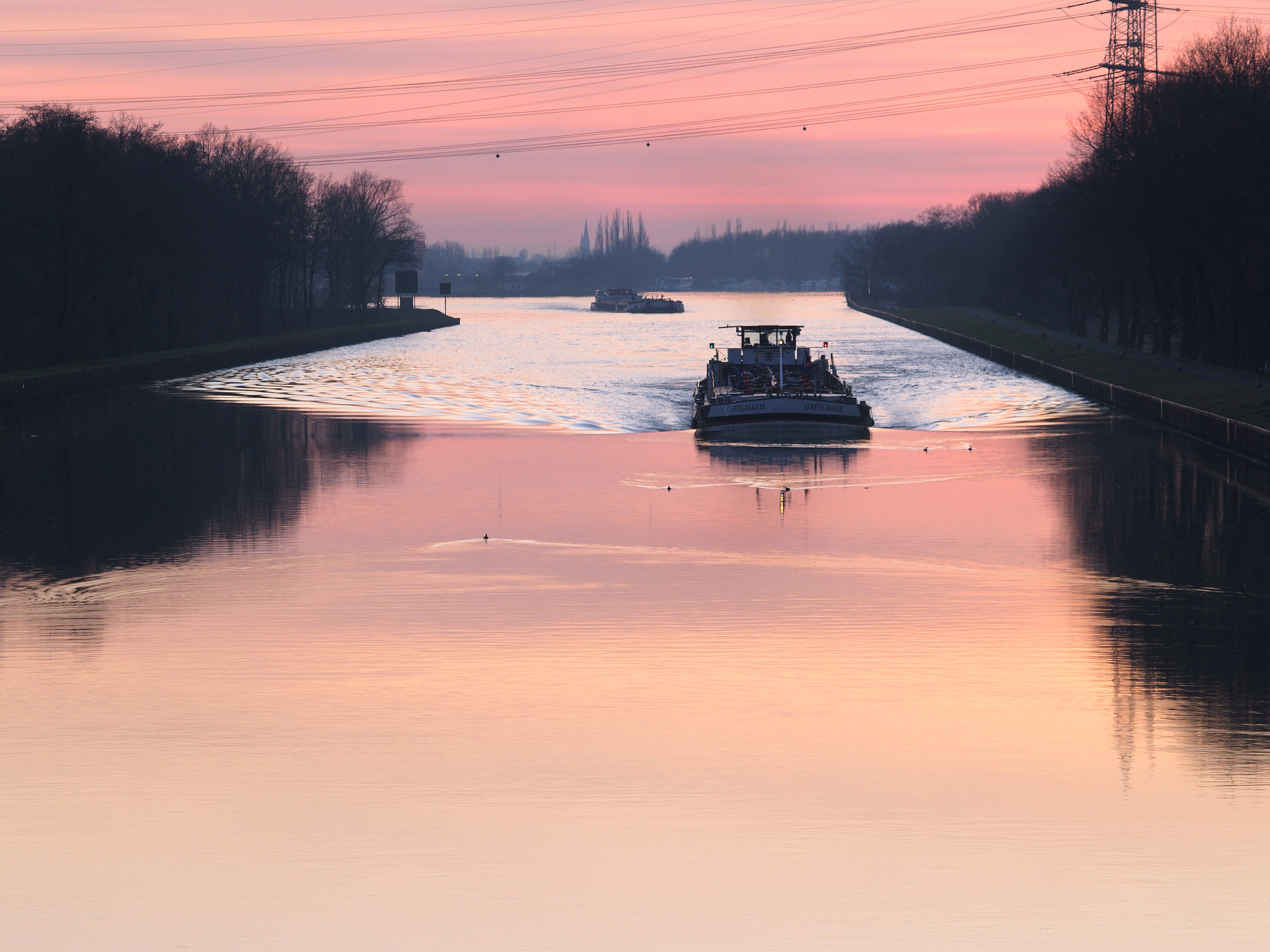
Bow wave of a canal barge

A bow wave is the wave that forms at the bow of a ship when it moves through the water. As the bow wave spreads out, it defines the outer limits of a ship's wake. A large bow wave slows the ship down, is a risk to smaller boats, and in a harbor can damage shore facilities and moored ships. Therefore, ship hulls are generally designed to produce as small a bow wave as possible.

== Description ==
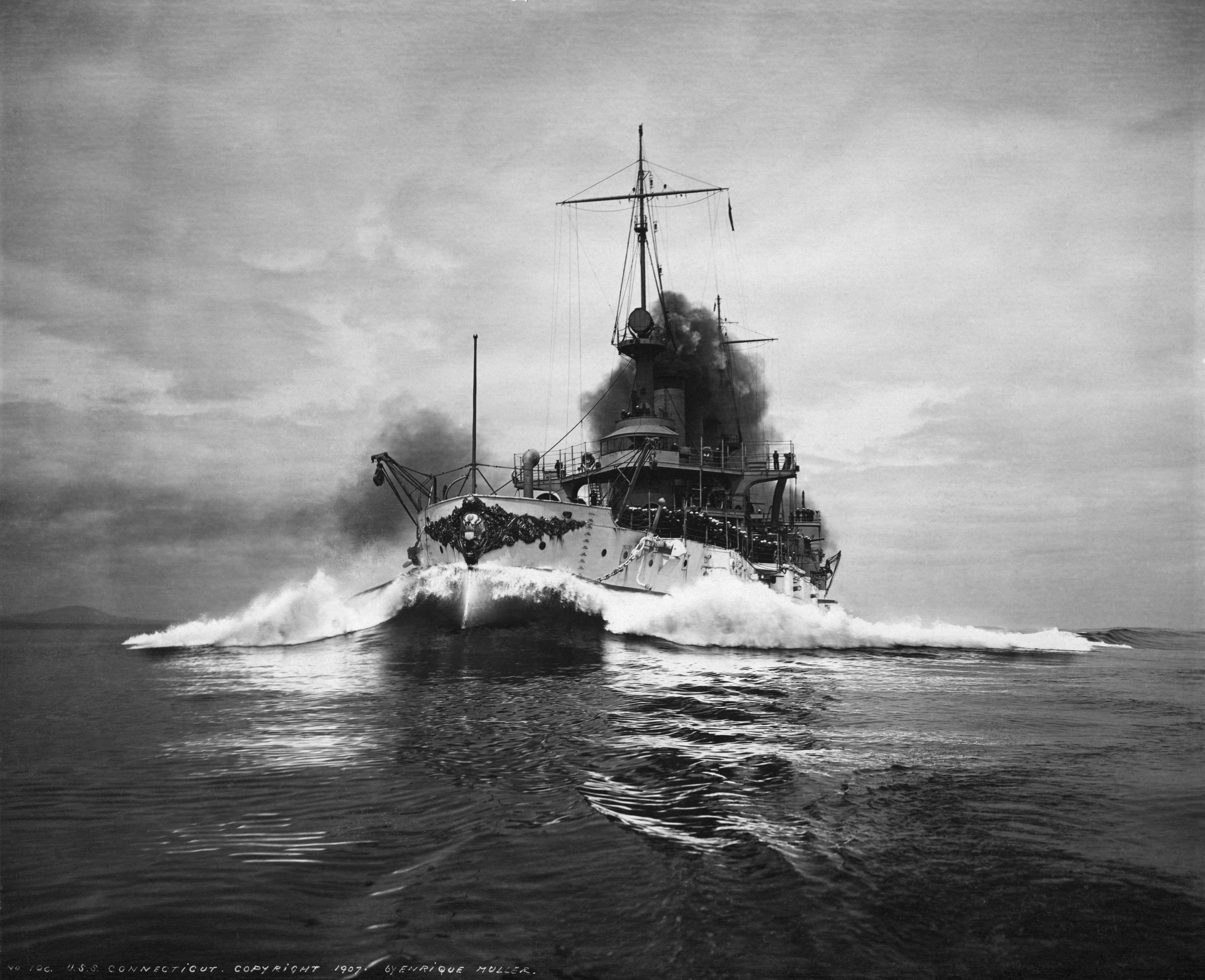
Bow wave of the USS Connecticut, on her speed trials in 1906 or 1907

The size of the bow wave is a function of the speed of the ship, its draft, surface waves, water depth, and the shape of the bow. A ship with a large draft and a blunt bow will produce a large wave, and ships that plane over the water surface will create smaller bow waves. Bow wave patterns are studied in the field of computational fluid dynamics.

The bow wave carries energy away from the ship at the expense of its kinetic energy—it slows the ship. A major goal of naval architecture is therefore to reduce the size of the bow wave and improve the ship's fuel economy. Modern ships are commonly fitted with a bulbous bow to achieve this.

A bow wave forms at the head of a swimmer moving through water. The trough of this wave is near the mouth of the swimmer and helps the swimmer to inhale air to breathe just by turning their head.

A similar thing occurs when an airplane travels at the speed of sound. The overlapping wave crests disrupt the flow of air over and under the wings. Just as a boat can easily travel faster than the wave it produces, an airplane with sufficient power can travel faster than the speed of sound (supersonic).

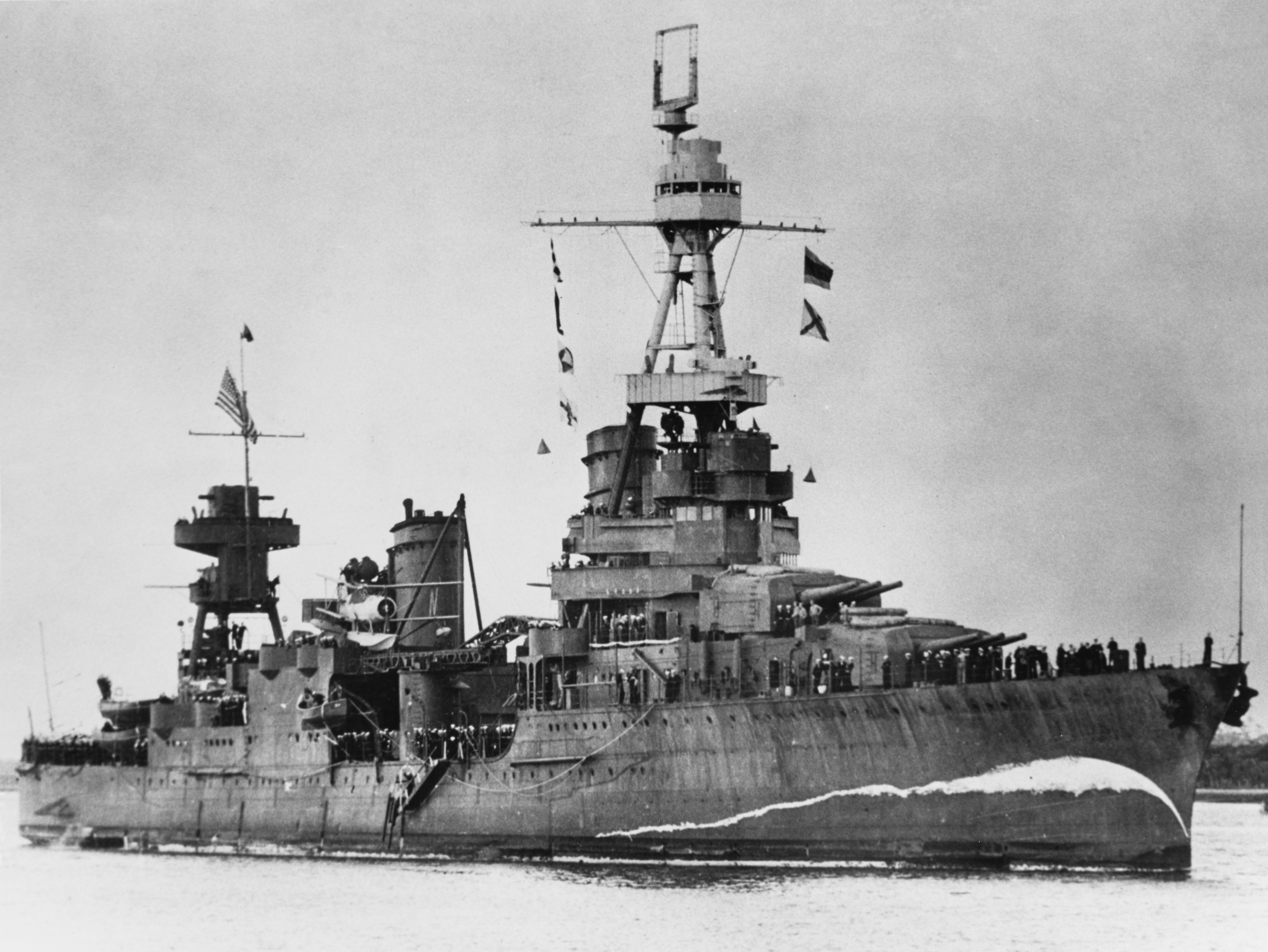
USS Northampton wearing a painted fake bow wave used to give the impression of high speed at all times (1941)

== See also ==
- Kelvin wake pattern
- Shock wave
- Bow shock (aerodynamics)
