= Wake (physics) =

Term in fluid dynamics

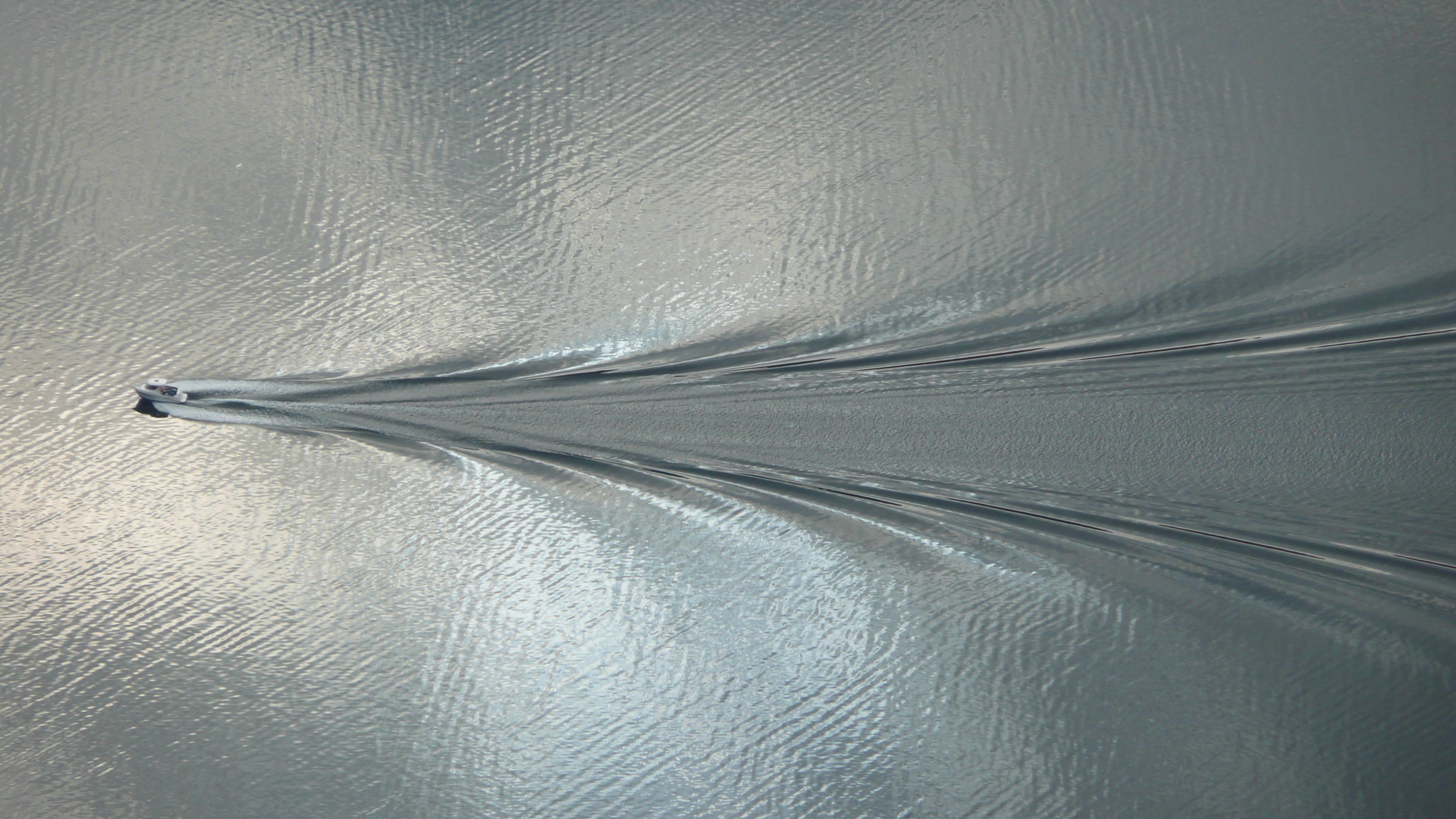
Kelvin wake pattern generated by a small boat.

In fluid dynamics, a wake may either be:

- the region of recirculating flow immediately behind a moving or stationary blunt body, caused by viscosity, which may be accompanied by flow separation and turbulence, or
- the wave pattern on the water surface downstream of an object in a flow, or produced by a moving object (e.g. a ship), caused by density differences of the fluids above and below the free surface and gravity (or surface tension).

== Viscosity ==
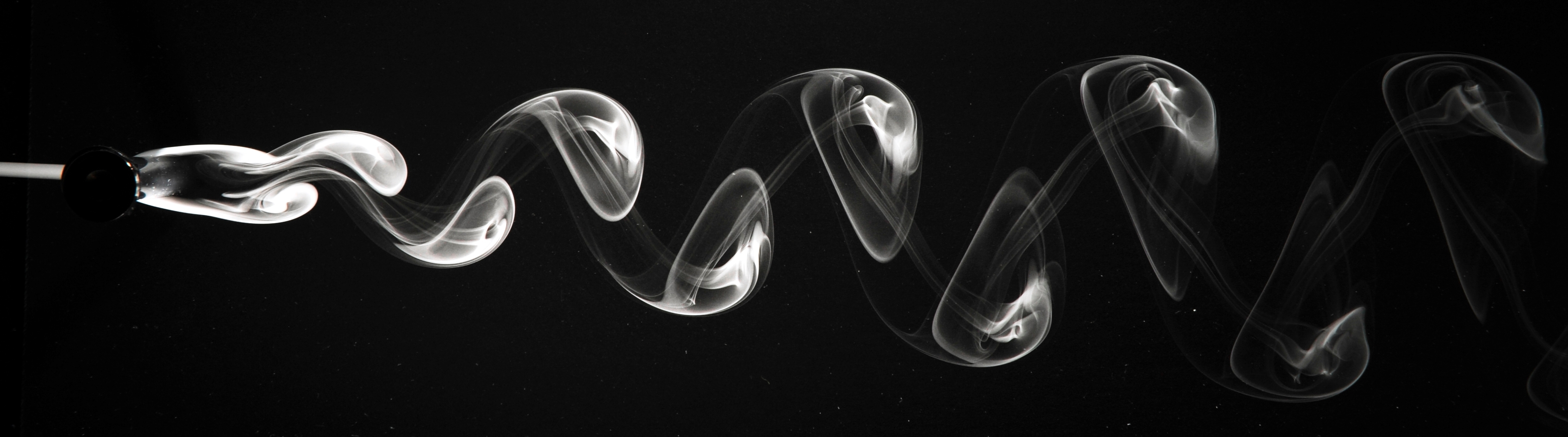
Visualisation of the Kármán vortex street in the wake behind a circular cylinder in air; the flow is made visible through release of oil vapour in the air near the cylinder.

The wake is the region of disturbed flow (often turbulent) downstream of a solid body moving through a fluid, caused by the flow of the fluid around the body.

For a blunt body in subsonic external flow, for example the Apollo or Orion capsules during descent and landing, the wake is massively separated and behind the body is a reverse flow region where the flow is moving toward the body. This phenomenon is often observed in wind tunnel testing of aircraft, and is especially important when parachute systems are involved, because unless the parachute lines extend the canopy beyond the reverse flow region, the chute can fail to inflate and thus collapse. Parachutes deployed into wakes suffer dynamic pressure deficits which reduce their expected drag forces. High-fidelity computational fluid dynamics simulations are often undertaken to model wake flows, although such modeling has uncertainties associated with turbulence modeling (for example RANS versus LES implementations), in addition to unsteady flow effects. Example applications include rocket stage separation and aircraft store separation.

== Density differences ==
In incompressible fluids (liquids) such as water, a bow wake is created when a watercraft moves through the medium; as the medium cannot be compressed, it must be displaced instead, resulting in a wave. As with all wave forms, it spreads outward from the source until its energy is overcome or lost, usually by friction or dispersion.

The non-dimensional parameter of interest is the Froude number.

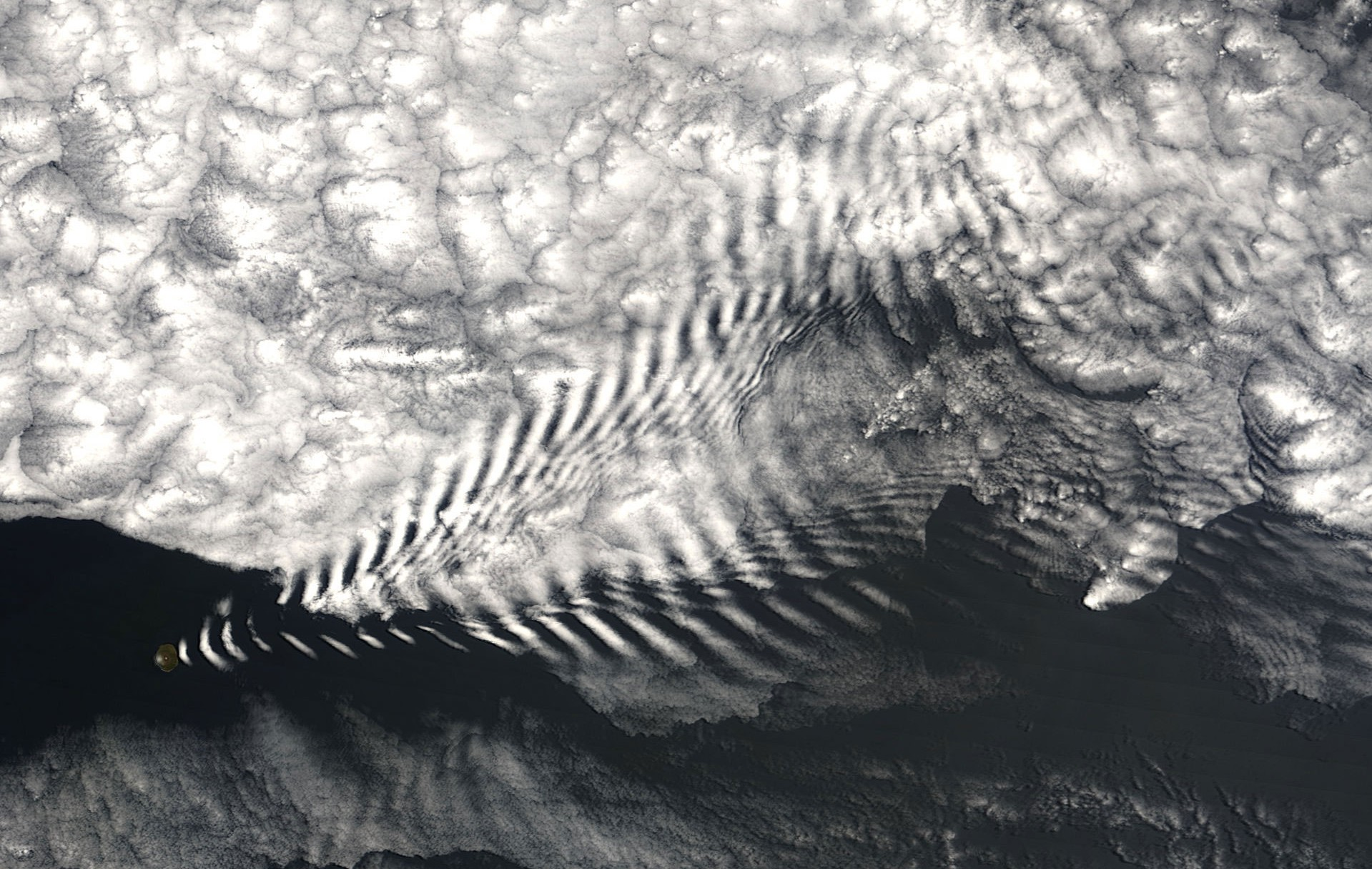
Wave cloud pattern in the wake of the Île Amsterdam (lower left, at the "tip" of the triangular formation of clouds) in the southern Indian Ocean

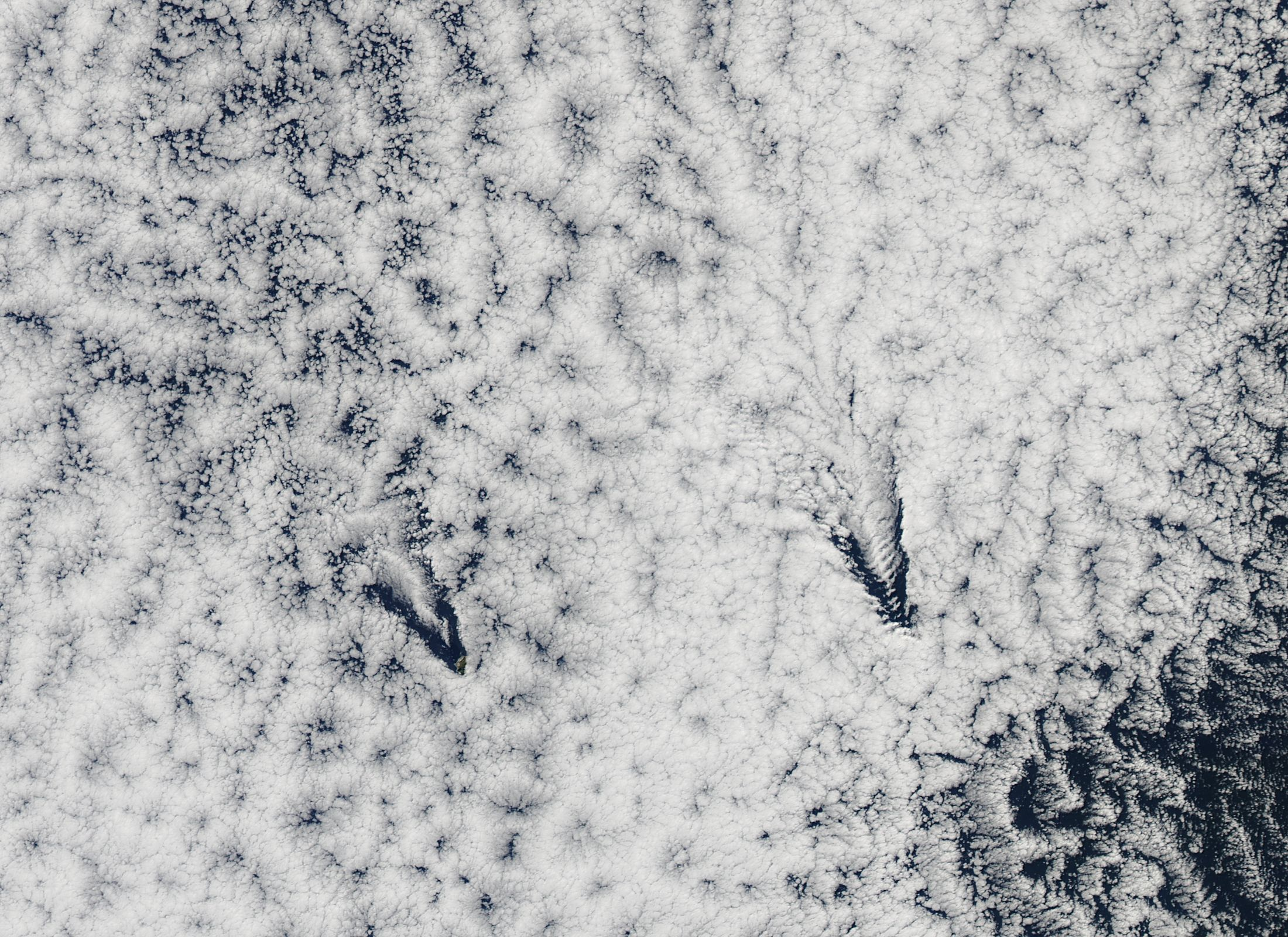
Cloud wakes from the Juan Fernández Islands

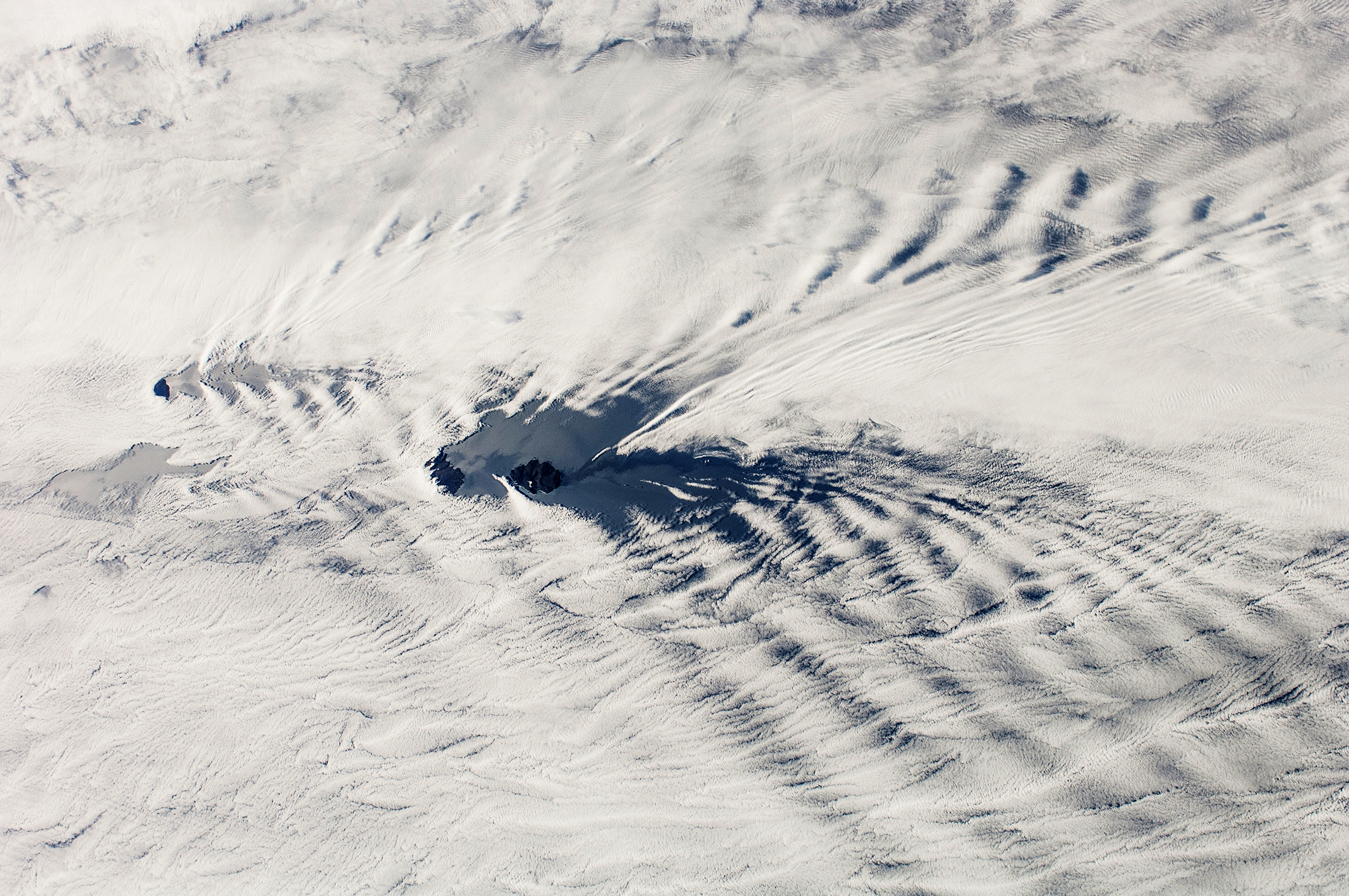
Wake patterns in cloud cover over Possession Island, East Island, Ile aux Cochons, Île des Pingouins

=== Kelvin wake pattern ===
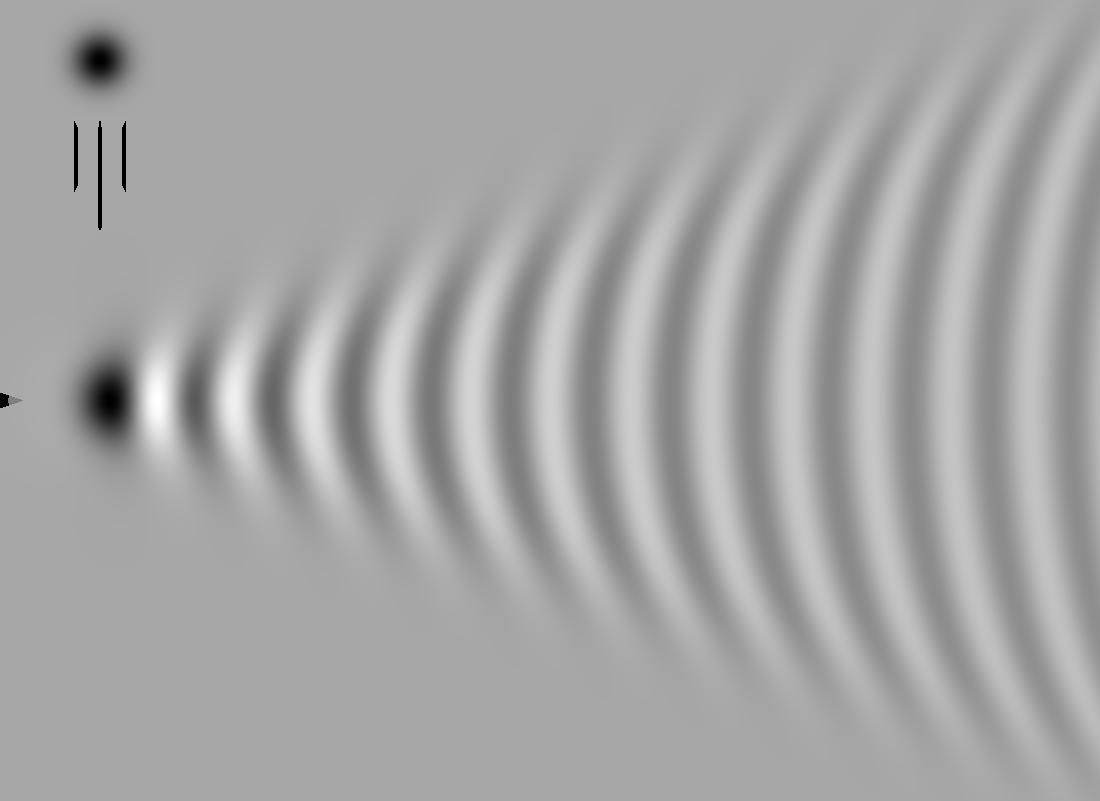
Fr = 0.5

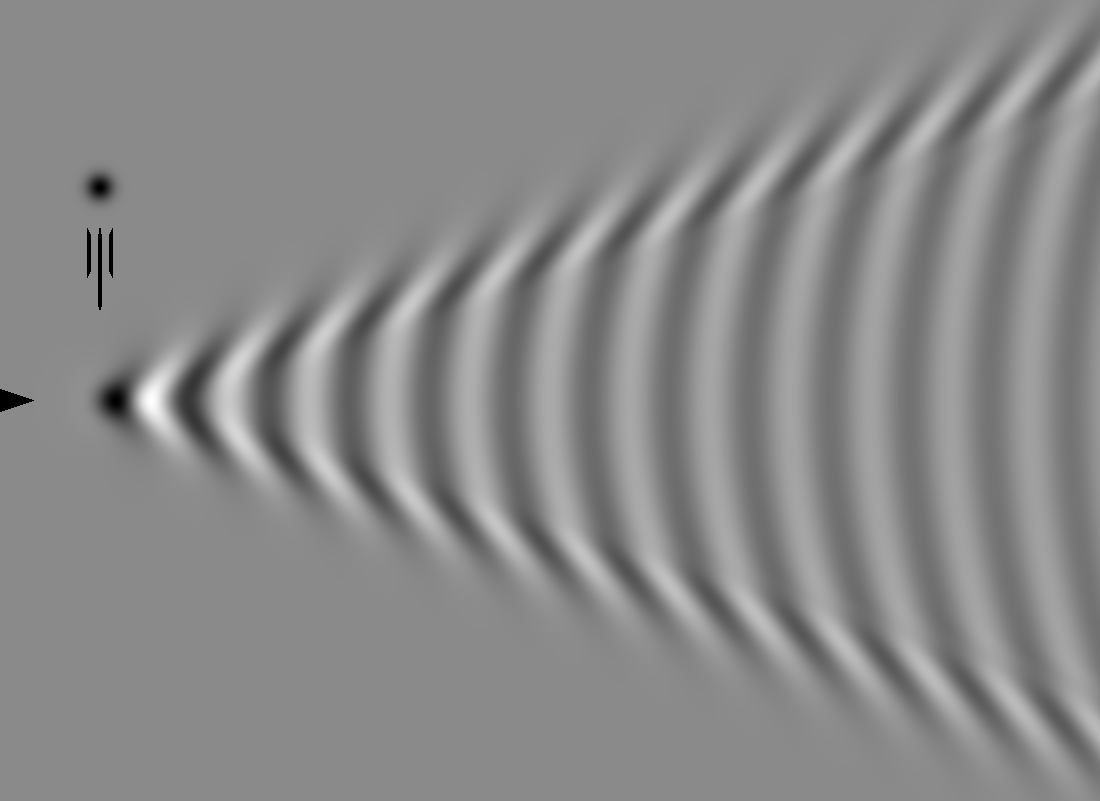
Fr = 1

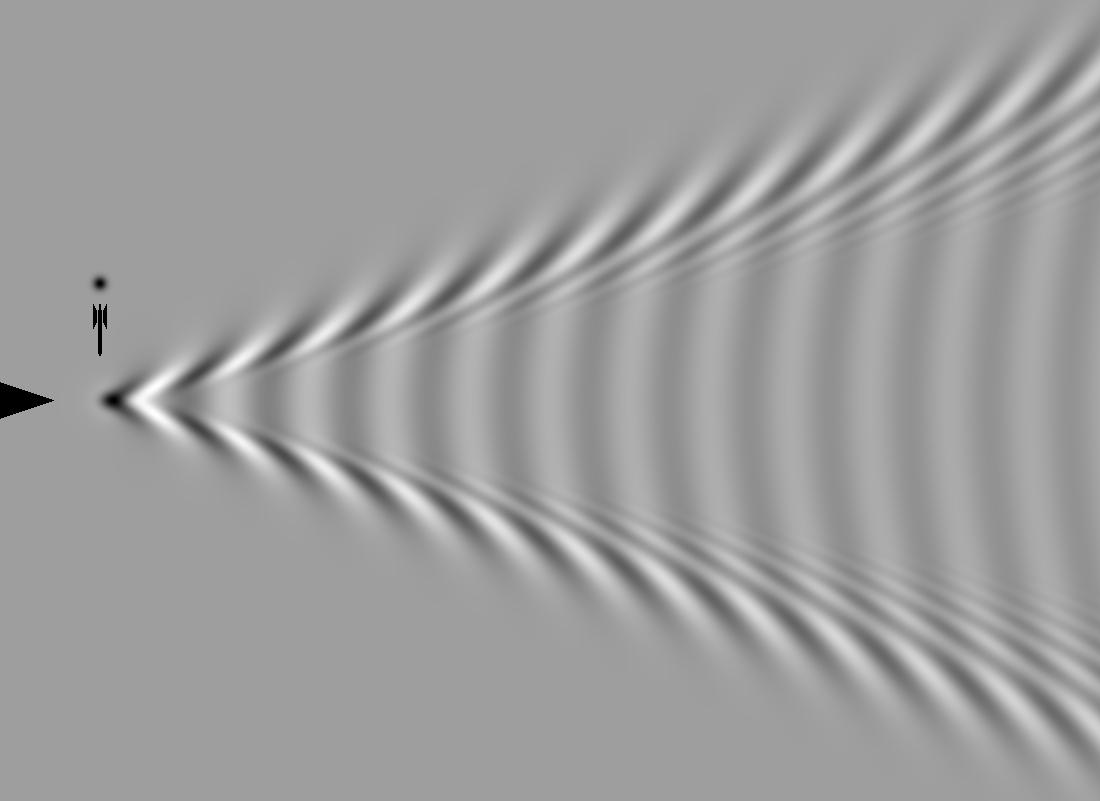
Fr = 2

Kelvin wake simulation for Gaussian distortion (shown besides the wake) at various Froude numbers

Waterfowl and boats moving across the surface of water produce a wake pattern, first explained mathematically by Lord Kelvin and known today as the Kelvin wake pattern.

This pattern consists of two wake lines that form the arms of a chevron, V, with the source of the wake at the vertex of the V. For sufficiently slow motion, each wake line is offset from the path of the wake source by around arcsin(1/3) = 19.47° and is made up of feathery wavelets angled at roughly 53° to the path.

== Other effects ==
The above describes an ideal wake, where the body's means of propulsion has no other effect on the water. In practice the wave pattern between the V-shaped wavefronts is usually mixed with the effects of propeller backwash and eddying behind the boat's (usually square-ended) stern.

The Kelvin angle is also derived for the case of deep water in which the fluid is not flowing in different speed or directions as a function of depth ("shear"). In cases where the water (or fluid) has shear, the results may be more complicated. Also, the deep water model neglects surface tension, which implies that the wave source is large compared to capillary length.

== Recreation ==
"No wake zones" may prohibit wakes in marinas, near moorings and within some distance of shore in order to facilitate recreation by other boats and reduce the damage wakes cause. Powered narrowboats on British canals are not permitted to create a breaking wash (a wake large enough to create a breaking wave) along the banks, as this erodes them. This rule normally restricts these vessels to 4 knots (4.6 mph; 7.4 km/h) or less.

Wakes are occasionally used recreationally. Swimmers, people riding personal watercraft, and aquatic mammals such as dolphins can ride the leading edge of a wake. In the sport of wakeboarding the wake is used as a jump. The wake is also used to propel a surfer in the sport of wakesurfing. In the sport of water polo, the ball carrier can swim while advancing the ball, propelled ahead with the wake created by alternating armstrokes in crawl stroke, a technique known as dribbling. Furthermore, in the sport of canoe marathon, competitors use the wake of fellow kayaks in order to save energy and gain an advantage, through the practice of sitting their boats on the wake of another, so their kayak is propelled by the wash.

== See also ==
- Bow shock (aerodynamics)
- Karman vortex street
- Kelvin wake pattern
- Slipstream
- Wake turbulence
