= Precursor (physics) =

Dual-velocity wave phenomenon

Precursors are characteristic wave patterns caused by dispersion of an impulse's frequency components as it propagates through a medium. Classically, precursors precede the main signal, although in certain situations they may also follow it. Precursor phenomena exist for all types of waves, as their appearance is only predicated on the prominence of dispersion effects in a given mode of wave propagation. This non-specificity has been confirmed by the observation of precursor patterns in different types of electromagnetic radiation (microwaves, visible light, and terahertz radiation) as well as in fluid surface waves and seismic waves.

== History ==
Precursors were first theoretically predicted in 1914 by Arnold Sommerfeld for the case of electromagnetic radiation propagating through a neutral dielectric in a region of normal dispersion. Sommerfeld's work was expanded in the following years by Léon Brillouin, who applied the saddle point approximation to compute the integrals involved. However, it was not until 1969 that precursors were first experimentally confirmed for the case of microwaves propagating in a waveguide, and much of the experimental work observing precursors in other types of waves has only been done since the year 2000. This experimental lag is mainly due to the fact that in many situations, precursors have a much smaller amplitude than the signals that give rise to them (a baseline figure given by Brillouin is six orders of magnitude smaller). As a result, experimental confirmations could only be done after technology became available to detect precursors.

== Basic theory ==
As a dispersive phenomenon, the amplitude at any distance and time of a precursor wave propagating in one dimension can be expressed by the Fourier integral

$$f(x,t)=\frac{1}{2\pi} \int \hat{\zeta}_0(\omega) \exp \left[-i\left(k(\omega)x-\omega t \right)\right] d\omega$$

where $\hat{\zeta}_0(\omega)$ is the Fourier transform of the initial impulse and the complex exponential $\exp \left[-i\left(k(\omega)x-\omega t \right)\right]$ represents the individual component wavelets summed in the integral. To account for the effects of dispersion, the phase of the exponential must include the dispersion relation (here, the $k(\omega)$ factor) for the particular medium in which the wave is propagating.

The integral above can only be solved in closed form when idealized assumptions are made about the initial impulse and the dispersion relation, as in Sommerfeld's derivation below. In most realistic cases, numerical integration is required to compute the integral.

== Sommerfeld's derivation for electromagnetic waves in a neutral dielectric ==
Assuming the initial impulse takes the form of a sinusoid turned on abruptly at time $t=0$,

$$f(t) = \left\{
\begin{array}{rl}
0 & t<0\\
\sin \frac{2\pi t}{\tau} & t \geq 0
\end{array} \right. ,$$

then we can write the general-form integral given in the previous section as

$$f(x,t)=-\frac{1}{\tau} \int e^{-i (k(\omega)x-\omega t)} \frac{d\omega}{\omega^2 - (2 \pi / \tau)^2} .$$

For simplicity, we assume the frequencies involved are all in a range of normal dispersion for the medium, and we let the dispersion relation take the form

$$k(\omega) = \frac{\omega}{c} \sqrt{1+\frac{a^2 \omega_0^2}{\omega_0^2-\omega^2}}$$

where $a^2= \frac{Nq^2}{m\epsilon_0 \omega_0^2}$, $N$ being the number of atomic oscillators in the medium, $q$ and $m$ the charge and mass of each one, $\omega_0$ the natural frequency of the oscillators, and $\epsilon_0$ the vacuum permittivity. This yields the integral

$$f(x,t)=-\frac{1}{\tau} \int \exp \left[-i \left(x\frac{\omega}{c} \sqrt{1+\frac{a^2 \omega_0^2}{\omega_0^2-\omega^2}} -\omega t\right)\right] \frac{d\omega}{\omega^2 - (2 \pi / \tau)^2} .$$

To solve this integral, we first express the time in terms of the retarded time $t' = t-\frac{x}{c}$, which is necessary to ensure that the solution does not violate causality by propagating faster than $c$. We also treat $|\omega|$ as large and ignore the $\frac{2\pi}{\tau}$ term in deference to the second-order $\omega$ term. Lastly, we substitute $\xi=\frac{a^2\omega_0^2}{2c}x$, getting

$$f(\xi,t')=-\frac{1}{\tau} \int \exp \left[-i\left(\frac{\xi}{\omega}+\omega t'\right)\right] \frac{d\omega}{\omega^2}$$

Rewriting this as

$$f(\xi,t')=-\frac{1}{\tau} \int \exp \left[-i \sqrt{\xi t'} \left(\frac{1}{\omega} \sqrt{\frac{\xi}{t'}}+\omega \sqrt{\frac{t'}{\xi}}\right)\right]\frac{d\omega}{\omega^2}$$

and making the substitutions

$$\omega\sqrt{\frac{t'}{\xi}}=e^{ik}, \qquad \frac{d\omega}{\omega}=idk, \qquad \frac{d\omega}{\omega^2}=i\sqrt{\frac{t'}{\xi}}e^{-ik} dk$$

allows the integral to be transformed into

$$f(\xi,t')=-\frac{i}{\tau} \sqrt{\frac{t'}{\xi}} \int \exp \left[-2i \sqrt{\xi t'} \cos k\right] e^{-ik} dk ,$$

where $k$ is simply a dummy variable, and, finally

$$f(\xi,t') = \frac{2\pi}{\tau} \sqrt{\frac{t'}{\xi}} J_1 \left(2\sqrt{\xi t'}\right) ,$$

where $J_1$ is a Bessel function of the first kind. This solution, which is an oscillatory function with amplitude and period that both increase with increasing time, is characteristic of a particular type of precursor known as the Sommerfeld precursor.

== Stationary-Phase-Approximation-Based Period Analysis ==
The stationary phase approximation can be used to analyze the form of precursor waves without solving the general-form integral given in the Basic Theory section above. The stationary phase approximation states that for any speed of wave propagation $\frac{x}{t}$ determined from any distance $x$ and time $t$, the dominant frequency $\omega_D$ of the precursor is the frequency whose group velocity equals $\frac{x}{t}$:

$$v_g(\omega_D)=\left. \frac{d\omega}{dk}\right|_{\omega_D}=\frac{x}{t}.$$

Therefore, one can determine the approximate period of a precursor waveform at a particular distance and time by calculating the period of the frequency component that would arrive at that distance and time based on its group velocity. In a region of normal dispersion, high-frequency components have a faster group velocity than low-frequency ones, so the front of the precursor should have a period corresponding to that of the highest-frequency component of the original impulse; with increasing time, components with lower and lower frequencies arrive, so the period of the precursor becomes longer and longer until the lowest-frequency component arrives. As more and more components arrive, the amplitude of the precursor also increases. The particular type of precursor characterized by increasing period and amplitude is known as the high-frequency Sommerfeld precursor.

In a region of anomalous dispersion, where low-frequency components have faster group velocities than high-frequency ones, the opposite of the above situation occurs: the onset of the precursor is characterized by a long period, and the period of the signal decreases with time. This type of precursor is called a low-frequency Sommerfeld precursor.

In certain situations of wave propagation (for instance, fluid surface waves), two or more frequency components may have the same group velocity for particular ranges of frequency; this is typically accompanied by a local extremum in the group velocity curve. This means that for certain values of time and distance, the precursor waveform will consist of a superposition of both low- and high-frequency Sommerfeld precursors. Any local extrema only correspond to single frequencies, so at these points there will be a contribution from a precursor signal with a constant period; this is known as a Brillouin precursor.
