= Jean-Marie Le Roux =

French mathematician

- Born: 4 April 1863; Prat, France
- Died: 28 September 1949 (aged 86); Rennes, France
- Citizenship: France
- Scientific career
- Fields: Mathematics
- Thesis: Sur les intégrales des équations linéaires aux dérivées partielles du second ordre à deux variables indépendantes (1894)

Jean-Marie Le Roux (4 April 1863, Prat, Côtes-d'Armor – 1949, Rennes) was a French applied mathematician.

Le Roux, the son of farmers, studied at the University of Rennes and, possibly, at the University of Bordeaux. He was an instructor at Guingamp from 1882 to 1889, a professor at the lycée at Brest from 1889 to 1896, and a professor at the lycée at Montpellier from 1896 to 1898. At the University of Rennes he became in 1898 a maître de conférences and in 1902 a professor of applied mathematics. He retired there in 1933 as professor emeritus with the title of professeur honoraire. He passed his agrégation examination in mathematics in 1889. He received his doctorate in 1894 at the Sorbonne, with Gaston Darboux, Gabriel Koenigs and Paul Appell on his thesis committee. The title of Le Roux's doctoral dissertation is Sur les intégrales des équations linéaires aux dérivées partielles du second ordre à deux variables indépendantes.

Le Roux did research on partial differential equations, integral equations, and differential geometry. For the French edition of Klein's encyclopedia he edited the article Wahrscheinlichkeitstheorie by Emanuel Czuber. In 1924 Le Roux was a Plenary Speaker at the ICM in Toronto.

Le Roux was a critic of Einstein's theory of relativity. In 1923 in a newspaper article, he expressed a very negative opinion of relativity theory. He was one of the authors of the 1931 book Hundert Autoren gegen Einstein.

Le Roux married in 1897.

== Selected publications ==
- Sur les intégrales des équations linéaires aux dérivées partielles du second ordre à deux variables indépendantes. Annales scientifiques de l'École Normale Supérieure Sér. 3, 12 (1895), p. 227–316
- Sur l'équation linéaire aux dérivées partielles du premier ordre. Bulletin de la Société Mathématique de France, 25 (1897), p. 63–71
- Extension de la méthode de Laplace aux équations linéaires aux dérivées partielles d'ordre supérieur au second. Bulletin de la Société Mathématique de France, 27 (1899), p. 237–262
- Sur un invariant d'un système de deux triangles et la théorie des intégrales doubles. Bulletin de la Société Mathématique de France, 28 (1900), p. 168–172
- Sur les caractéristiques des systèmes d'équations aux dérivées partielles. Bulletin de la Société Mathématique de France, 36 (1908), p. 129–133
- Étude géométrique de la torsion et de la flexion dans la déformation infinitésimale d'un milieu continu. Annales scientifiques de l'École Normale Supérieure Sér. 3, 28 (1911), p. 523–579
- Recherches sur la géométrie des déformations finies. Annales scientifiques de l'École Normale Supérieure Sér. 3, 30 (1913), p. 193–245
- Sur le problème de Dirichlet. Journal de Mathématiques Pures et Appliquées 10 (1914), p. 189–230.
- Le principe de relativité et la loi de la gravitation. Annales scientifiques de l'École Normale Supérieure Sér. 3, 50 (1933), p. 127–169
