= Herbert Dingle =

English physicist and philosopher of science (1890–1978)

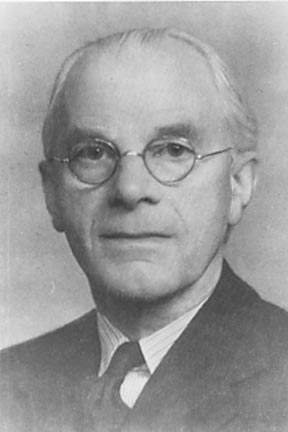
- Born: 2 August 1890; London, England
- Died: 4 September 1978 (aged 88); Kingston upon Hull, England
- Occupations: Physicist, philosopher of science

Academic background
- Academic advisor: Alfred Fowler

Academic work
- Notable students: Mary Hesse

Herbert Dingle (2 August 1890 – 4 September 1978) was an English physicist and philosopher of science, who served as president of the Royal Astronomical Society from 1951 to 1953. He is best known for his opposition to Albert Einstein's special theory of relativity and the protracted controversy that this provoked.

== Biography ==
Dingle was born in London, but spent his early years in Plymouth, where he was taken following the death of his father, and where he attended Plymouth Science, Art and Technical Schools. Due to lack of money, he left school at the age of 14 and found employment as a clerk, a job which he held for 11 years. At age 25 he won a scholarship to the Imperial College, London, from which he graduated in 1918. In that same year, Dingle married Alice Westacott who later gave birth to a son. As a Quaker, Dingle was exempt from military service during World War I. He took a position as a Demonstrator in the Physics Department, and devoted himself to the study of spectroscopy (following his mentor Alfred Fowler), especially its applications in astronomy. He was elected a Fellow of the Royal Astronomical Society in 1922.

Dingle was a member of the British government eclipse expeditions of 1927 (Colwyn Bay) and 1932 (Montreal), both of which failed to make any observations due to overcast skies. He spent most of 1932 at the California Institute of Technology as a Rockefeller Foundation Scholar. There he met the theoretical cosmologist R. C. Tolman, and studied relativistic cosmology. A second visit to the United States followed in 1936 when he was invited to give the Lowell Lectures at Harvard, upon which he based Through Science to Philosophy (1937).

Dingle became a professor of Natural Philosophy at Imperial College in 1938, and was a professor of History and Philosophy of Science at University College London from 1946 until his retirement in 1955. Thereafter he held the customary title of Professor Emeritus from that institution. He was one of the founders of the British Society for the History of Science, and served as President from 1955 to 1957. He founded what later became the British Society for the Philosophy of Science as well as its journal, the British Journal for The Philosophy of Science.

Dingle was the author of Modern Astrophysics (1924) and Practical Applications of Spectrum Analysis (1950). He also wrote the monographs Relativity for All (1922) and The Special Theory of Relativity (1940).

A collection of Dingle's lectures on the history and philosophy of science was published in 1954. He also took an interest in English literature, and published Science and Literary Criticism in 1949, and The Mind of Emily Brontë in 1974.

== Controversies ==
Dingle participated in two very public scientific controversies. The first of these took place during the 1930s and was triggered by Dingle's criticism of E. A. Milne's cosmological model and the associated theoretical methodology, which Dingle considered overly speculative and not based on empirical data. A. S. Eddington was another target of Dingle's criticism, and the ensuing debate eventually involved nearly every prominent astrophysicist and cosmologist in Britain. Dingle characterized his opponents as "traitors" to the scientific method, and called them "the modern Aristotelians" because he believed their theorizing was based on rationalism rather than empiricism. Some other scientists, notably Willem de Sitter, while not endorsing Dingle's more extreme rhetoric, nevertheless agreed with Dingle that the cosmological models of Milne, Eddington, and others were overly speculative. However, most modern cosmologists subsequently accepted the validity of the hypothetico-deductive method of Milne.

The second dispute began in the late 1950s, following Dingle's retirement and centered on the theory of special relativity. Initially Dingle argued that, contrary to the usual understanding of the famous twin paradox, special relativity did not predict unequal aging of twins, one of whom makes a high-speed voyage and returns to Earth. However, Dingle then came to realize and acknowledge that his understanding of the problem had been mistaken. He then began to argue that special relativity was empirically wrong in its predictions, although experimental evidence showed he was mistaken about this. Ultimately, Dingle re-focused his criticism to claim that special relativity was logically inconsistent, declaring that special relativity "unavoidably requires that A works more slowly than B and B more slowly than A – which it requires no super-intelligence to see is impossible." Hence he asserted that the well-known reciprocity of the Lorentz transformation is self-evidently impossible. As Whitrow explained in his obituary for Dingle, this is not correct, as it rests on Dingle's mistaken assumption that the conflicting ratios of event times used by Dingle are invariants.

Dingle carried on a highly public and contentious campaign to get this conclusion accepted by the scientific community, mostly through letters to the editors of various scientific periodicals, including Nature. Dozens of scientists responded with answers to Dingle's claims, explaining why the reciprocity of the Lorentz transformation does not entail any logical inconsistency, but Dingle rejected all the explanations. This culminated in his 1972 book, Science at the Crossroads in which Dingle stated that "a proof that Einstein's special theory of relativity is false has been advanced; and ignored, evaded, suppressed and, indeed, treated in every possible way except that of answering it, by the whole scientific world." He also warned: "Since this theory is basic to practically all physical experiments, the consequences if it is false, modern atomic experiments being what they are, may be immeasurably calamitous." The consensus in the physics community is that Dingle's objections to the logical consistency of special relativity were unfounded. According to Max Born, "Dingle's objections are just a matter of superficial formulation and confusion."

== Selected publications ==
- "Values of T ^{ν}_{μ} and the Christoffel symbols for a line element of considerable generality" Proceedings of the National Academy of Sciences of the United States of America 19(5): 559–563 doi:10.1073/pnas.19.5.559
- With J. H. Sheldon: Dingle, Herbert; Sheldon, J. H. (June 1938). "A spectrographic examination of the mineral content of human and other milk". Biochem J. 32 (6): 1078–1086. doi:10.1042/bj0321078. PMC 1264149. PMID 16746716.
