= Kelvin wake pattern =

Pattern of movement across water

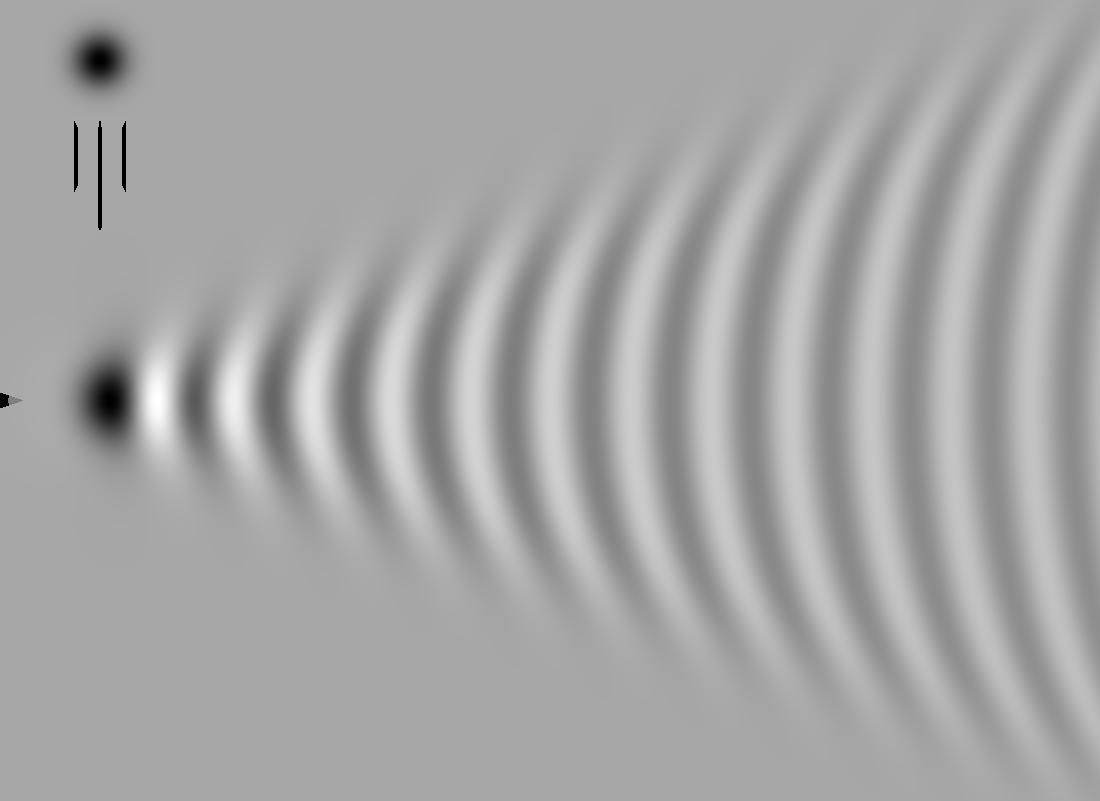
Fr = 0.5

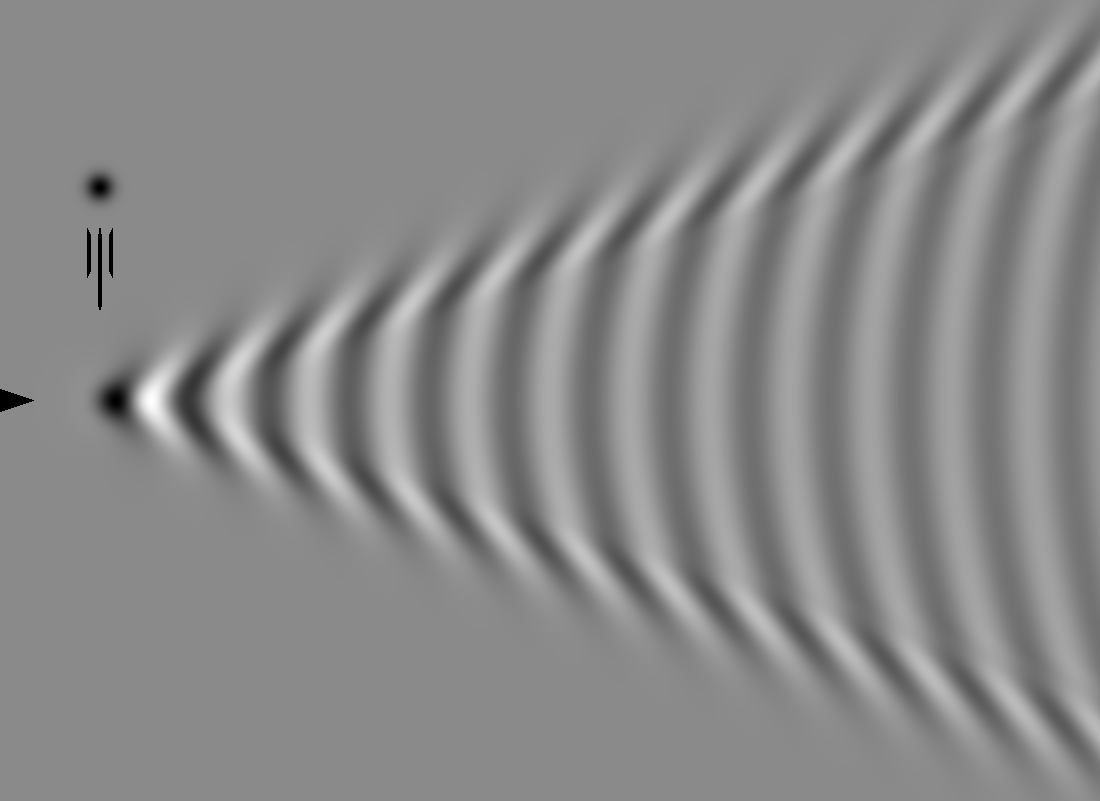
Fr = 1

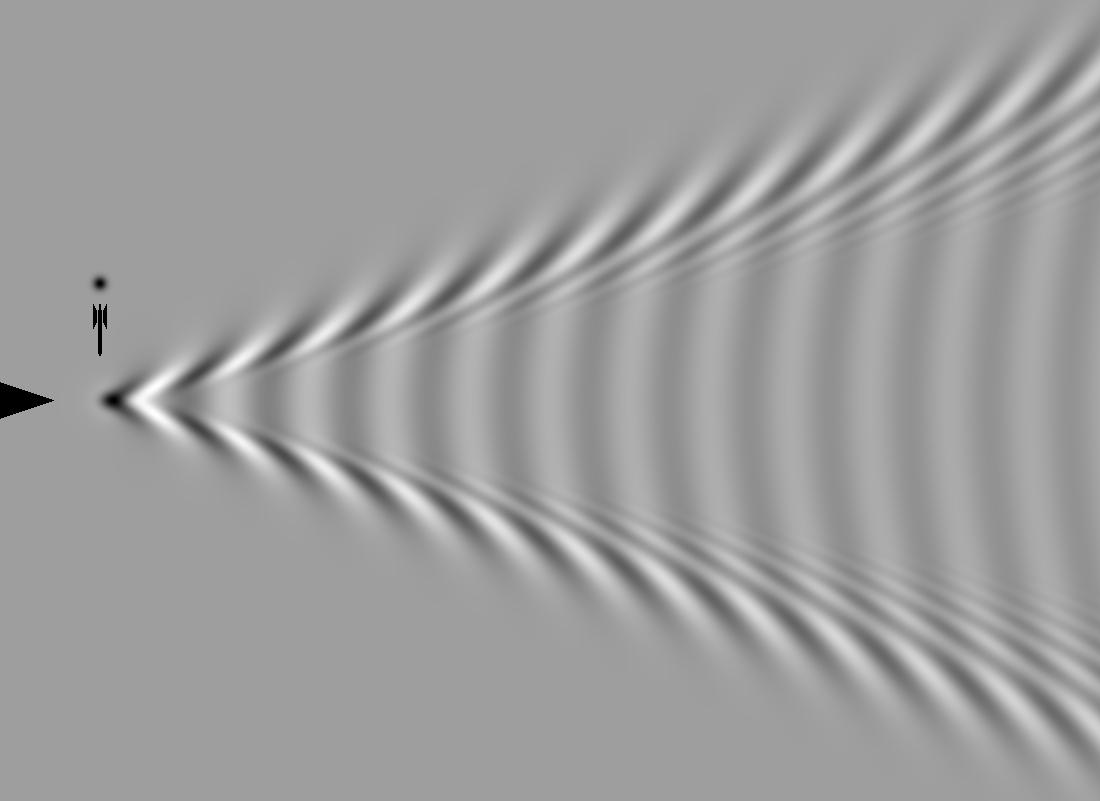
Fr = 2

Kelvin wake simulation for Gaussian distortion (shown besides the wake) at various Froude numbers

Waterfowl and boats moving across the surface of water produce a wake pattern, first explained mathematically by Lord Kelvin and known today as the Kelvin wake pattern.

This pattern consists of two wake lines that form the arms of a chevron, V, with the source of the wake at the vertex of the V. For sufficiently slow motion, each wake line is offset from the path of the wake source by around arcsin(1/3) = 19.47° and is made up of feathery wavelets angled at roughly 53° to the path.

== Shape ==
The inside of the V (of total opening 39° as indicated above) is filled with transverse curved waves, each of which resembles an arc of a circle centered at a point lying on the path at a distance twice that of the arc to the wake source. This part of the pattern is independent of the speed and size of the wake source over a significant range of values.

However, at higher speeds (specifically, at large Froude number) other parts of the pattern come into play. At the tips of the transverse wave arcs their crests turn around and continue inside the V cone and towards the source, forming an overlapping pattern of narrower waves directed outside of the cone. As the source's speed increases, these shorter waves begin to dominate and form a second V within the pattern, which grows narrower as the increased speed of the source emphasizes the shorter waves that are closer to the source's path.

The angles in this pattern are not intrinsic properties of merely water: Any isentropic and incompressible liquid with low viscosity will exhibit the same phenomenon. Furthermore, this phenomenon has nothing to do with turbulence. Everything discussed here is based on the linear theory of an ideal fluid, cf. Airy wave theory.

Parts of the pattern may be obscured by the effects of propeller wash, and tail eddies behind the boat's stern, and by the boat being a large object and not a point source. The water need not be stationary, but may be moving as in a large river, and the important consideration then is the velocity of the water relative to a boat or other object causing a wake.

== Formula ==
This pattern follows from the dispersion relation of deep water waves, which is often written as,

$$\omega = \sqrt{g k},$$

where

g = the strength of the gravity field
ω is the angular frequency in radians per second
k = angular wavenumber in radians per metre

"Deep" means that the depth is greater than half of the wavelength. This formula implies that the group velocity of a deep water wave is half of its phase velocity, which, in turn, goes as the square root of the wavelength. Two velocity parameters of importance for the wake pattern are:

v is the relative velocity of the water and the surface object that causes the wake.
c is the phase velocity of a wave, varying with wave frequency.

== Formation ==
As the surface object moves, it continuously generates small disturbances which are the sum of sinusoidal waves with a wide spectrum of wavelengths. Those waves with the longest wavelengths have phase speeds above v and dissipate into the surrounding water and are not easily observed. Other waves with phase speeds at or below v, however, are amplified through constructive interference and form visible shock waves, stationary in position with respect to the surface object (e.g. boat).

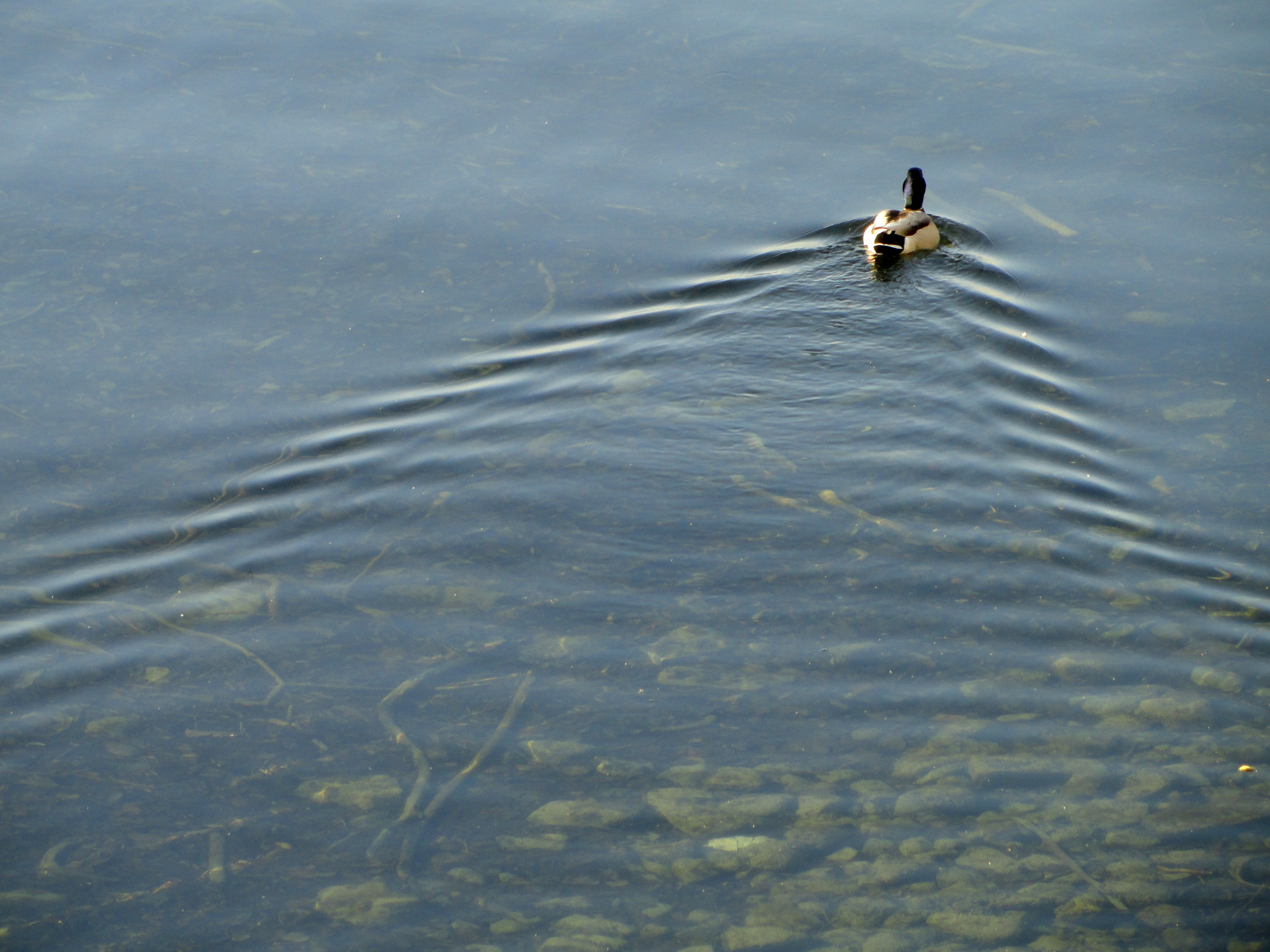
Typical duck wake

The angle θ between the phase shock wave front and the path of the object is θ = arcsin(c/v). If c/v > 1 or < −1, no later waves can catch up with earlier waves and no shockwave forms.

In deep water, shock waves form even from slow-moving sources, because waves with short enough wavelengths move slower. These shock waves are at sharper angles than one would naively expect, because it is group velocity that dictates the area of constructive interference and, in deep water, the group velocity is half of the phase velocity.

=== Angles ===
All shock waves, that each by itself would have had an angle between 33° and 72°, are compressed into a narrow band of wake with angles between 15° and 19°, with the strongest constructive interference at the outer edge (angle arcsin(1/3) = 19.47°), placing the two arms of the V in the celebrated Kelvin wake pattern.

A concise geometric construction demonstrates that, strikingly, this group shock angle w.r.t. the path of the boat, 19.47°, for any and all of the above θ, is actually independent of v, c, and g; it merely relies on the fact that the group velocity is half of the phase velocity c. On any planet, slow-swimming objects have "effective Mach number" 3.

Envelope of the disturbance emitted at successive times, fig 12.3 p.410 of G.B. Whitham (1974) Linear and Nonlinear Waves. The circles represent wavefronts.

For slow swimmers, low Froude number, the Lighthill−Whitham geometric argument that the opening of the Kelvin chevron (wedge, V pattern) is universal goes as follows. Consider a boat moving from right to left with constant speed v, emitting waves of varying wavelength, and thus wavenumber k and phase velocity c(k), of interest when < v for a shock wave (cf., e.g., Sonic boom or Cherenkov radiation). Equivalently, and more intuitively, fix the position of the boat and have the water flow in the opposite direction, like a piling in a river.

Focus first on a given k, emitting (phase) wavefronts whose stationary position w.r.t. the boat assemble to the standard shock wedge tangent to all of them, cf. Fig.12.3.

As indicated above, the openings of these chevrons vary with wavenumber, the angle θ between the phase shock wavefront and the path of the boat (the water) being θ = arcsin(c/v) ≡ π/2 − ψ. Evidently, ψ increases with k. However, these phase chevrons are not visible: it is their corresponding group wave manifestations which are observed.

Envelope of the disturbance emitted at successive times, fig 12.2 p.409 of G.B. Whitham (1974) Linear and Nonlinear Waves. Here ψ is the angle between the path of the wave source and the direction of wave propagation (the wave vector k), and the circles represent wavefronts.

Consider one of the phase circles of Fig.12.3 for a particular k, corresponding to the time t in the past, Fig.12.2. Its radius is QS, and the phase chevron side is the tangent PS to it. Evidently, PQ= vt and SQ = ct = vt cosψ, as the right angle PSQ places S on the semicircle of diameter PQ.

Since the group velocity is half the phase velocity for any and all k, however, the visible (group) disturbance point corresponding to S will be T, the midpoint of SQ. Similarly, it lies on a semicircle now centered on R, where, manifestly, RQ=PQ/4, an effective group wavefront emitted from R, with radius vt/4 now.

Significantly, the resulting wavefront angle with the boat's path, the angle of the tangent from P to this smaller circle, obviously has a sine of TR/PR=1/3, for any and all k, c, ψ, g, etc.: Strikingly, virtually all parameters of the problem have dropped out, except for the deep-water group-to-phase-velocity relation! Note the (highly notional) effective group disturbance emitter moves slower, at 3v/4.

Thus, summing over all relevant k and ts to flesh out an effective Fig.12.3 shock pattern, the universal Kelvin wake pattern arises: the full visible chevron angle is twice that, 2arcsin(1/3) ≈ 39°.

The wavefronts of the wavelets in the wake are at 53°, which is roughly the average of 33° and 72°. The wave components with would-be shock wave angles between 73° and 90° dominate the interior of the V. They end up half-way between the point of generation and the current location of the wake source. This explains the curvature of the arcs.

Those very short waves with would-be shock wave angles below 33° lack a mechanism to reinforce their amplitudes through constructive interference and are usually seen as small ripples on top of the interior transverse waves.

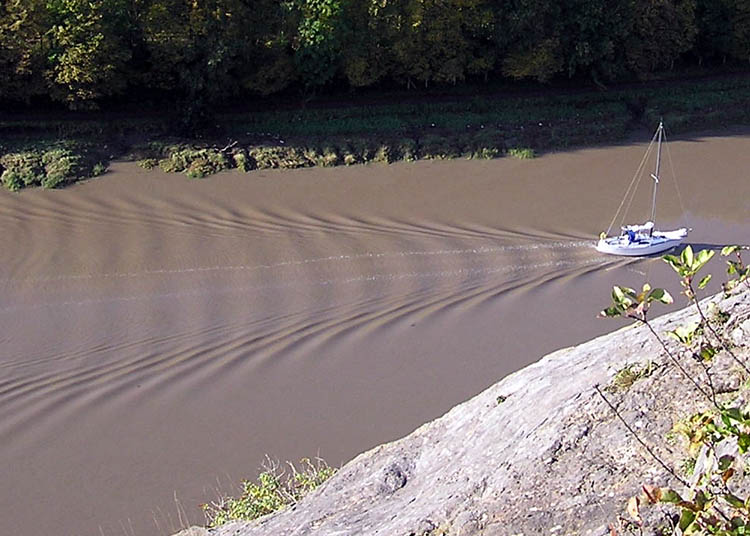

Wavefronts (lines of constant phase) for a moving point source of surface waves in comoving frame of reference

The nature of two types of crests, longitudinal and transverse, is graphically illustrated by the pattern of wavefronts of a moving point source in proper frame. The radii of wavefronts are proportional, due to dispersion, to the square of time (measured from the moment of emission), and the envelope of the wavefronts represents the Kelvin wake pattern.
