= Front velocity =

Speed at which the first rise of a pulse above zero moves forward

In physics, front velocity is the speed at which the first rise of a pulse above zero moves forward.

In mathematics, it is used to describe the velocity of a propagating front in the solution of hyperbolic partial differential equation.

== Various velocities ==
Associated with propagation of a disturbance are several different velocities. For definiteness, consider an amplitude modulated electromagnetic carrier wave. The phase velocity is the speed of the underlying carrier wave. The group velocity is the speed of the modulation or envelope. Initially it was thought that the group velocity coincided with the speed at which information traveled. However, it turns out that this speed can exceed the speed of light in some circumstances, causing confusion by an apparent conflict with the theory of relativity. That observation led to consideration of what constitutes a signal.

By definition, a signal involves new information or an element of 'surprise' that cannot be predicted from the wave motion at an earlier time. One possible form for a signal (at the point of emission) is: $f(t) = u(t) \sin \omega t \, ,$ where u(t) is the Heaviside step function. Using such a form for a signal, it can be shown, subject to the (expected) condition that the refractive index of any medium tends to one as the frequency tends to infinity, that the wave discontinuity, called the front, propagates at a speed less than or equal to the speed of light c in any medium. In fact, the earliest appearance of the front of an electromagnetic disturbance (the precursor) travels at the front velocity, which is c, no matter what the medium. However, the process always starts from zero amplitude and builds up.
