= Group velocity =

Velocity at which the overall shape of a wave's amplitudes propagates

Frequency dispersion in groups of gravity waves on the surface of deep water. The red square moves with the phase velocity, and the green circles propagate with the group velocity. In this deep-water case, the phase velocity is twice the group velocity. The red square overtakes two green circles when moving from the left to the right of the figure. New waves seem to emerge at the back of a wave group, grow in amplitude until they are at the center of the group, and vanish at the wave group front. For surface gravity waves, the water particle velocities are much smaller than the phase velocity, in most cases.

Propagation of a wave packet demonstrating a phase velocity greater than the group velocity.

This shows a wave with the group velocity and phase velocity going in different directions. The group velocity is positive (i.e., the envelope of the wave moves rightward), while the phase velocity is negative (i.e., the peaks and troughs move leftward).

The group velocity of a wave is the velocity with which the overall envelope shape of the wave's amplitudes—known as the modulation or envelope of the wave—propagates through space.

For example, if a stone is thrown into the middle of a very still pond, a circular pattern of waves with a quiescent center appears in the water, also known as a capillary wave. The expanding ring of waves is the wave group or wave packet, within which one can discern individual waves that travel faster than the group as a whole. The amplitudes of the individual waves grow as they emerge from the trailing edge of the group and diminish as they approach the leading edge of the group.

== History ==
The idea of a group velocity distinct from a wave's phase velocity was first proposed by W.R. Hamilton in 1839, and the first full treatment was by Rayleigh in his "Theory of Sound" in 1877.

== Definition and interpretation ==
A wave packet. The envelope of the wave packet. The envelope moves at the group velocity.

Consider a linear evolution model of waves that admits as fundamental solutions the oscillators $e^{i(kx-\omega t)}$, where $k$ and $\omega$ are bound to satisfy a certain constraint. For instance, the free linear Schrödinger equation in one dimension:

$$i\hbar\partial_t\Psi+\frac{\hbar^2}{2m}\partial_x^2 \Psi=0$$

satisfies the above description with $\omega=\frac{\hbar}{2m}k^2$. The group velocity $v_g$ is defined by the equation:
$$v_\text{g} \ \equiv\  \frac{\partial \omega}{\partial k}\,.$$

Here, ω is the wave's angular frequency (usually expressed in radians per second), and k is the angular wavenumber (usually expressed in radians per meter). The phase velocity is: v_{p} = ω/k.

The function ω(k), which gives ω as a function of k, is known as the dispersion relation.

- If ω is directly proportional to k, then the group velocity is exactly equal to the phase velocity. A wave of any shape will travel undistorted at this velocity.
- If ω is a linear function of k, but not directly proportional (ω = ak + b, b ≠ 0), then the group velocity and phase velocity are different. The envelope of a wave packet (see figure on right) will travel at the group velocity, while the individual peaks and troughs within the envelope will move at the phase velocity.
- If ω is not a linear function of k, the envelope of a wave packet will become distorted as it travels. Since a wave packet contains a range of different frequencies (and hence different values of k), the group velocity ∂ω/∂k will be different for different values of k. Therefore, the envelope does not move at a single velocity, but its wavenumber components (k) move at different velocities, distorting the envelope. If the wavepacket has a narrow range of frequencies, and ω(k) is approximately linear over that narrow range, the pulse distortion will be small, in relation to the small nonlinearity. See further discussion below. For example, for deep water gravity waves, $\omega = \sqrt{gk}$, and hence v_{g} = v_{p} /2.
  This underlies the Kelvin wake pattern for the bow wave of all ships and swimming objects. Regardless of how fast they are moving, as long as their velocity is constant, on each side the wake forms an angle of 19.47° = arcsin(1/3) with the line of travel.

=== Derivation ===
One derivation of the formula for group velocity is as follows.

Consider a wave packet as a function of position x and time t: α(x,t).

Let A(k) be its Fourier transform at time t = 0,
$$\alpha(x, 0) = \int_{-\infty}^\infty dk \, A(k) e^{ikx}.$$

By the superposition principle, the wavepacket at any time t is
$$\alpha(x, t) = \int_{-\infty}^\infty dk \, A(k) e^{i(kx - \omega t)},$$
where ω is implicitly a function of k.

Assume that the wave packet α is almost monochromatic, so that A(k) is sharply peaked around a central wavenumber k_{0}.

Then, linearization gives
$$\omega(k) \approx \omega_0 + \left(k - k_0\right)\omega'_0$$
where
$$\omega_0 = \omega(k_0)$$
and $\omega'_0 = \left.\frac{\partial \omega(k)}{\partial k}\right|_{k=k_0}$ (see next section for discussion of this step). Then, after some algebra,
$$\alpha(x,t) = e^{i\left(k_0 x - \omega_0 t\right)}\int_{-\infty}^\infty dk \, A(k) e^{i(k - k_0)\left(x - \omega'_0 t\right)}.$$

There are two factors in this expression. The first factor, $e^{i\left(k_0 x - \omega_0 t\right)}$, describes a perfect monochromatic wave with wavevector k_{0}, with peaks and troughs moving at the phase velocity $\omega_0/k_0$ within the envelope of the wavepacket.

The other factor,
$$\int_{-\infty}^\infty dk \, A(k) e^{i(k - k_0)\left(x - \omega'_0 t\right)},$$
gives the envelope of the wavepacket. This envelope function depends on position and time only through the combination $(x - \omega'_0 t)$.

Therefore, the envelope of the wavepacket travels at velocity
$$\omega'_0 = \left.\frac{d\omega}{dk}\right|_{k=k_0}~,$$
which explains the group velocity formula.

=== Other expressions ===
For light and speed of light c, the refractive index n, vacuum wavelength λ_{0}, and wavelength in the medium λ, are related by
$$\lambda_0 = \frac{2\pi c}{\omega}, \;\; \lambda = \frac{2\pi}{k} = \frac{2\pi v_\text{p}}{\omega}, \;\; n = \frac{c}{v_\text{p}} = \frac{\lambda_0}{\lambda},$$
with v_{p} = ω/k the phase velocity.

The group velocity, therefore, can be calculated by any of the following formulas,
$$\begin{align}
v_\text{g} &= \frac{c}{n + \omega \frac{\partial n}{\partial \omega}}
= \frac{c}{n - \lambda_0 \frac{\partial n}{\partial \lambda_0}}\\
&= v_\text{p} \left(1 + \frac{\lambda}{n} \frac{\partial n}{\partial \lambda}\right)
= v_\text{p} - \lambda \frac{\partial v_\text{p}}{\partial \lambda} = v_\text{p} + k \frac{\partial v_\text{p}}{\partial k}.
\end{align}$$

== Dispersion ==
Distortion of wave groups by higher-order dispersion effects, for surface gravity waves on deep water (with v_{g} = 1/2v_{p}). This shows the superposition of three wave components—with respectively 22, 25 and 29 wavelengths fitting in a periodic horizontal domain of 2 km length. The wave amplitudes of the components are respectively 1, 2 and 1 meter.

Part of the previous derivation is the Taylor series approximation that:
$$\omega(k) \approx \omega_0 + (k - k_0)\omega'_0(k_0)$$

If the wavepacket has a relatively large frequency spread, or if the dispersion ω(k) has sharp variations (such as due to a resonance), or if the packet travels over very long distances, this assumption is not valid, and higher-order terms in the Taylor expansion become important.

As a result, the envelope of the wave packet not only moves, but also distorts, in a manner that can be described by the material's group velocity dispersion. Loosely speaking, different frequency-components of the wavepacket travel at different speeds, with the faster components moving towards the front of the wavepacket and the slower moving towards the back. Eventually, the wave packet gets stretched out. This is an important effect in the propagation of signals through optical fibers and in the design of high-power, short-pulse lasers.

== Relation to phase velocity, refractive index and transmission speed ==
In the context of electromagnetics and optics, the frequency is some function ω(k) of the wave number, so in general, the phase velocity and the group velocity depend on specific medium and frequency. The ratio between the speed of light c and the phase velocity v_{p} is known as the refractive index, n = c / v_{p} = ck / ω.

In this way, we can obtain another form for group velocity for electromagnetics. Writing n = n(ω), a quick way to derive this form is to observe
$$k = \frac{1}{c} \omega n(\omega) \implies dk = \frac{1}{c}\left(n(\omega) + \omega \frac{\partial}{\partial \omega}n(\omega)\right)d\omega.$$
We can then rearrange the above to obtain
$$v_g = \frac{\partial w}{\partial k} = \frac{c}{n+\omega\frac{\partial n}{\partial \omega}}.$$

From this formula, we see that the group velocity is equal to the phase velocity only when the refractive index is independent of frequency $\partial n / \partial\omega = 0$. When this occurs, the medium is called non-dispersive, as opposed to dispersive, where various properties of the medium depend on the frequency ω. The relation $\omega(k)$ is known as the dispersion relation of the medium.

== In three dimensions ==
For waves traveling through three dimensions, such as light waves, sound waves, and matter waves, the formulas for phase and group velocity are generalized in a straightforward way:

- One dimension: $v_\text{p} = \omega/k, \quad v_\text{g} = \frac{\partial \omega}{\partial k}, \,$
- Three dimensions: $\mathbf{v}_\text{p} = \frac{\omega}{k} \hat{\mathbf{k}}, \quad \mathbf{v}_\text{g} = \vec{\nabla}_{\mathbf{k}} \, \omega \,$

where $\vec{\nabla}_{\mathbf{k}} \, \omega$ means the gradient of the angular frequency ω as a function of the wave vector $\mathbf{k}$, and $\hat{\mathbf{k}}$ is the unit vector in direction k.

If the waves are propagating through an anisotropic (i.e., not rotationally symmetric) medium, for example a crystal, then the phase velocity vector and group velocity vector may point in different directions.

== In lossy or gainful media ==
The group velocity is often thought of as the velocity at which energy or information is conveyed along a wave. In most cases this is accurate, and the group velocity can be thought of as the signal velocity of the waveform. However, if the wave is travelling through an absorptive or gainful medium, this does not always hold. In these cases the group velocity may not be a well-defined quantity, or may not be a meaningful quantity.

In his text "Wave Propagation in Periodic Structures", Brillouin argued that in a lossy medium the group velocity ceases to have a clear physical meaning. An example concerning the transmission of electromagnetic waves through an atomic gas is given by Loudon. Another example is mechanical waves in the solar photosphere: The waves are damped (by radiative heat flow from the peaks to the troughs), and related to that, the energy velocity is often substantially lower than the waves' group velocity.

Despite this ambiguity, a common way to extend the concept of group velocity to complex media is to consider spatially damped plane wave solutions inside the medium, which are characterized by a complex-valued wavevector. Then, the imaginary part of the wavevector is arbitrarily discarded and the usual formula for group velocity is applied to the real part of wavevector, i.e.,
$$v_\text{g} = \left(\frac{\partial \left(\operatorname{Re} k\right)}{\partial \omega}\right)^{-1} .$$

Or, equivalently, in terms of the real part of complex refractive index, n = n + iκ, one has
$$\frac{c}{v_\text{g}} = n + \omega \frac{\partial n}{\partial \omega} .$$

It can be shown that this generalization of group velocity continues to be related to the apparent speed of the peak of a wavepacket. The above definition is not universal, however: alternatively one may consider the time damping of standing waves (real k, complex ω), or, allow group velocity to be a complex-valued quantity. Different considerations yield distinct velocities, yet all definitions agree for the case of a lossless, gainless medium.

The above generalization of group velocity for complex media can behave strangely, and the example of anomalous dispersion serves as a good illustration. At the edges of a region of anomalous dispersion, $v_\text{g}$ becomes infinite (surpassing even the speed of light in vacuum), and $v_\text{g}$ may easily become negative (its sign opposes Rek) inside the band of anomalous dispersion.

=== Superluminal group velocities ===
Since the 1980s, various experiments have verified that it is possible for the group velocity (as defined above) of laser light pulses sent through lossy materials, or gainful materials, to significantly exceed the speed of light in vacuum c. The peaks of wavepackets were also seen to move faster than c.

In all these cases, however, there is no possibility that signals could be carried faster than the speed of light in vacuum, since the high value of v_{g} does not help to speed up the true motion of the sharp wavefront that would occur at the start of any real signal. Essentially the seemingly superluminal transmission is an artifact of the narrow band approximation used above to define group velocity and happens because of resonance phenomena in the intervening medium. In a wide band analysis it is seen that the apparently paradoxical speed of propagation of the signal envelope is actually the result of local interference of a wider band of frequencies over many cycles, all of which propagate perfectly causally and at phase velocity. The result is akin to the fact that shadows can travel faster than light, even if the light causing them always propagates at light speed; since the phenomenon being measured is only loosely connected with causality, it does not necessarily respect the rules of causal propagation, even if it under normal circumstances does so and leads to a common intuition.

== See also ==
- Wave propagation
- Dispersion (water waves)
- Dispersion (optics)
- Wave propagation speed
- Group delay
- Group velocity dispersion
- Group delay dispersion
- Phase delay
- Phase velocity
- Signal velocity
- Slow light
- Front velocity
- Matter wave § Group velocity
- Soliton
