= Auerbach (surname) =

Auerbach and Averbuch and Aberbach is a German surname, commonly Jewish, derived from a toponym meaning meadow-brook. Notable people with this surname include the following:

- Abraham Auerbach (died 1846), German rabbi
- Abraham Dov Auerbach (1926–2008), Israeli rabbi
- Abraham Dov Auerbach (Tiberias) (1935–2021), Israeli rabbi
- Alan J. Auerbach (born 1951), American economist
- Alexander Auerbach (born 1988), German handball player
- Alexander Andreevich Auerbach (1844–1916), Russian mining engineer, industrialist, creator and organizer of production, scientist
- Alfred Auerbach (1873–1954), German actor and writer
- Arnold Auerbach (disambiguation), multiple people
- Arnold M. Auerbach (1912–1998), American screenwriter
- Artie Auerbach (1903–1957), American comedian, press photographer
- Auerbach (Jewish family), a family of scholars in the 16th to 19th centuries
- Baruch Auerbach (1793–1864), German-Jewish educator
- Beatrice Fox Auerbach (1887–1968), philanthropist, president and director of G. Fox & Co. from 1938 to 1959
- Ben Auerbach (1919–1993), American professional basketball player
- Benjamin Auerbach (1855–1940), German physician
- Benjamin Hirsch Auerbach (1808–1872), German Orthodox rabbi
- Berthold Auerbach (1812–1882), German-Jewish poet and author
- Chaim Auerbach (1839–?), Polish rabbi
- Chaim Yehuda Leib Auerbach (1883–1954), Israeli rabbi
- Charlotte Auerbach (1899–1994), German-Jewish geneticist
- Christopher Auerbach-Brown (born 1970), American composer and music educator
- Cornelia Schröder-Auerbach (1900–1997), German musicologist and author
- Dan Auerbach (born 1979), American guitarist and vocalist for The Black Keys
- Dathan Auerbach, author of the novel Penpal
- David Auerbach, American writer with a background in software engineering
- Doron Aurbach (born 1952), Israeli electrochemist, materials and surface scientist
- Eldad Auerbach (1914–2003), Israeli military man and businessman
- Elizaveta Borisovna Auerbach (1912–1995), Soviet actress of theater and cinema, pop, writer
- Ella Auerbach (1900–1999), one of the first female German lawyers
- Ellen Auerbach (1906–2004), German-born American photographer
- Erich Auerbach (photographer) (1911–1977), Czech-Jewish photographer
- Ephraim Auerbach (1892–1973), Yiddish writer, poet, editor and translator
- Erich Auerbach (1892–1957), German-born American scholar of literature
- Felix Auerbach (1856–1933), German physicist
- Frank Auerbach (1931–2024), German-born British painter
- Friedrich Auerbach (1870–1925), German chemist
- Gary Auerbach, American television and film writer, director and producer
- Gerhard Auerbach, German football player
- Heinrich Auerbach (ex. Heinrich Stromer) (1482–1542), physician and senator of Leipzig
- Herbert S. Auerbach (1882–1945), Jewish businessman and politician
- Herman Auerbach (1901–1942), Polish mathematician
- Ilya Auerbach (also known as Ilya Averbakh), Russian Jewish filmmaker
- Inge Auerbacher (born 1934), German-American chemist and Holocaust survivor with a related name ("someone from a meadow brook")
- Isaac Auerbach (architect) (1827–1875), German architect
- Isaac L. Auerbach (1921–1992), early advocate and pioneer of computing technologies
- Yitzhak Auerbach (1877–1951), Israeli rabbi
- Itzhak Itzik Auerbach (1846-?), Polish rabbi
- Ivan Bogdanovich Auerbach (1815–1867), Russian geologist and mineralogist, professor
- Jacob Auerbach (1810–1887), German educator and writer
- Jake Auerbach (born 1958), British documentary film maker
- Jerold Auerbach (born 1936), American historian
- John Auerbach (1922–2002), Israeli writer in English
- Johann Gottfried Auerbach (1697–1753), Austrian painter and etcher
- Johann Karl Auerbach (1723–1780s), Austrian painter
- Joseph Danziger Auerbach, Yiddish writer
- Larry Auerbach (1923–2014), American television director and National Vice President of the Directors Guild of America
- Leonore Auerbach (born 1933), German politician
- Leopold Auerbach (1828–1897), German physician
- Leopold Auerbach (jurist) (1847–1925), German jurist and historian
- Lera Auerbach (born 1973), Soviet-Russian-born American classical composer and pianist
- Lisa Anne Auerbach (born 1967), American artist
- Ludwig Auerbach (1840–1882), German merchant, jeweler and poet
- Marian Auerbach (1882–1941), also known as Majer Auerbach, Polish classical philologist
- Max Auerbach (1879–1968), German zoologist
- Meir Auerbach (1815–1878), first Ashkenazi Chief Rabbi of Jerusalem
- Menachem Nata Auerbach (1858–1930), Rabbi in the Land of Israel
- Menahem Mendel Auerbach (1620–1689), Austrian rabbi, banker, and commentator
- Neil Auerbach (born 1958), private equity investor
- Nikolai Konstantinovich Auerbach (1892–1930), Soviet scientist, archaeologist, local historian
- Oscar Auerbach (1905–1997), Jewish-American pathologist
- Paul Auerbach (1951–2021), American physician who wrote about wilderness medicine
- Philipp Auerbach (1906–1952), Head of the Bavarian State Compensation Office
- Red Auerbach (1917–2006), Boston Celtics coach
- Rick Auerbach (born 1950), American baseball player
- Rokhl Auerbakh (1903–1976), Polish-Israeli writer and Holocaust scholar
- Shmuel Auerbach (1931–2018), Israeli rabbi
- Shona Auerbach, British film director and cinematographer
- Siegmund Auerbach (1866–1923), German neurologist
- Sol Auerbach (1906–1986), American historian better known as James S. Allen
- Solomon Heymann Auerbach (died 1836), Hebrew scholar and translator
- Stephen Auerbach, American filmmaker
- Stevanne Auerbach (1938–2022), also known as Dr. Toy, American child development expert
- Tauba Auerbach (born 1981), visual artist
- Thomas Auerbach (1947–2020), civil rights activist in the GDR
- Walter Auerbach (1905–1975), German politician and resistance fighter against Nazism
- Wilfried Auerbach (1960–2025), Austrian rower
- Willi Auerbach (born 1980), German illusionist
- Yael Averbuch (born 1986), American soccer player
- Yuri Averbakh (1922–2022), Russian chess grandmaster with the Russianized form of the name
- A prominent family of Ashkenazi Orthodox rabbis in Jerusalem, including:
  - Chaim Yehuda Leib Auerbach (1883–1954), rosh yeshiva
  - Shlomo Zalman Auerbach (1910–1995), for whom the Jerusalem neighborhood Ramat Shlomo is named
  - Shmuel Auerbach (1931–2018), Haredi (ultra-Orthodox) rabbi
  - Ezriel Auerbach (or Azriel Auerbach) (born 1937), Haredi rabbi, son of Shlomo Zalman Auerbach.

== See also ==
- Auerbacher
