= Dembitzer =

Dembitzer is a Yiddish surname. Notable people with the surname include:

- Benny Dembitzer (fl. 1962–2016), British economist
- Haim Nathan Dembitzer (1820–1892), Polish rabbi and historian
