= Igor Kvetnoy =

Igor Moiseevich Kvetnoy
- Born: December 31, 1948 (age 77); Khabarovsk
- Education: Kuibyshev Medical Institute named after D.I. Ulyanov
- Awards: Lenin Komsomol Prize, Russian Federation Government Prize in Science and Technology, Pearse Prize of the Royal Microscopical Society,
- Scientific career
- Fields: Molecular Medicine, Neuroimmunoendocrinology
- Workplaces: Head of Pathomorphological Department of the Research Institute of Obstetrics and Gynecology (St. Petersburg)

Igor Moiseevich Kvetnoy (Russian: Игорь Моисеевич Кветной; born December 31, 1948) is a Russian expert in the field of molecular medicine and neuroendocrinology. He participated in the discovery of extrapineal melatonin production. He contributed to the discovery and development of the doctrine of diffuse neuroendocrine immune system (DNIES) and considered a founder of the Russian scientific school of neuroimmunoendoсrinology.

== Biography ==
=== Family ===
Igor Kvetnoy was born on December 31, 1948, in Khabarovsk to a family of scientists. Is father is Moses Solomonovich Kvetnoy, (a professor, the head of the Marxist–Leninist philosophy department at Higher Party School of Khabarovsk). His mother is Galina Samuilovna Nekhamkina, a candidate of medical sciences, and an expert in the field of biochemistry.

He is married to Tatiana Victorovna Cvetnaya, doctor of biological sciences, professor. She is Head of the Laboratory of biogerontology at St. Petersburg Institute of Bioregulation and Gerontology under the Northwest Branch of the Russian Academy of Medical Sciences, and Secretary of the Academic Council of the Institute.

=== Moving to Kuibyshev ===
I.M. Kvetnoy is the only child in the family. According to the recollections of parents the Far Eastern climate does not suit him, as a child he was often sick with colds. For this reason, the family decided to move to Kuibyshev to a cousin of his mother. However his father did not want to let go long from Khabarovsk. The family was able to relocate in 1960 - after Galina Samuilovna wrote a personal letter to N.S. Khrushchev. In Kuibyshev M.S. Kvetnoy headed the Department of Philosophy of the Kuibyshev Aviation Institute.

=== Choosing a career ===
I.M. Kvetnoy finished art school in Kuibyshev and dreamed of becoming a historian of art. However, his parents asked him to choose between aviation and a medical institute. Impressed by the book by Charlotte Auerbach "Genetics" I.M. Kvetnoy chose medicine. In 1972 he graduated from the Kuibyshev Medical Institute named after D.I. Ulyanov.

=== Career ===
After graduation, he decided to become a pathologist. I.M. Kvetnoy became a pathologist in the Central Republican Clinical Hospital in Saransk. After two months, he became a head of the Pathology Department of the Republican Children's Clinical Hospital.

==== Obninsk Medical Radiological Research Center ====
In 1984, I.M. Kvetnoy moved to Obninsk to the position of Senior Researcher at the Laboratory of Experimental Pathology of Medical Radiological Research Center. In about 10 years (from 1991 to 2000), I.M. Kvetnoy was the head of this laboratory.

==== St. Petersburg ====
Since 2002, I.M. Kvetnoy heeds the department of pathology at Saint Petersburg Research Institute of Obstetrics and Gynaecology.

== Main scientific achievements ==
In 1974, I.M. Kvetnoy, with his scientific supervisor N.T. Reichlin, opened extra pineal product melatonin. During the long research, he found that intestinal cells have the ability to synthesize melatonin. Then, it was found that melatonin is produced in other parts of gastrointestinal tract, as well as in cells of many organs - for example, in the liver, kidney, adrenals, gall bladder, ovary, endometrium, placenta, thymus, leukocytes, platelets and vascular endothelium.

Professor Kvetnoy is one of the founders of the national scientific school of neuroimmunoendocrinology. He is also one of the authors of the first two editions in Russian handbooks for neuroimmunoendocrinology. Under scientific supervision of I.M. Kvetnoy, 20 doctors and 38 candidates of sciences were trained. I.M. Kvetnoy is the author of several popular science books. I.M. Kvetnoy repeatedly appeared on various topical medical programs at a local TV channel of St. Petersburg.
