= Menachem Mendel Krochmal =

Moravian rabbi

Menahem Mendel ben Abraham Krochmal (c. 1600 – 1661) was a Moravian rabbi born in Kraków. His teacher in the Talmud was Joel Sirkes, author of Bayis Chadash. Krochmal soon distinguished himself so highly that with the permission of his master he was able to open a yeshiva, which sent forth scholars like Gershon Ashkenazi (afterward his son-in-law), and Menahem Mendel Auerbach, author of Ateres Zekeinim. The Jews of Cracow, in appreciation of his learning, made Krochmal dayan.

About 1636 Krochmal left his native city and went to Moravia. He was appointed rabbi of Kremsir, where he also founded a yeshivah. In 1645 he returned to Cracow; in the following year he became rabbi of Prossnitz; and in 1650 he accepted a call to the district rabbinate of Nikolsburg. He died in Nikolsburg on January 2, 1661.

Krochmal's son Aryeh Leib, who followed him in the rabbinate at Nikolsburg, published from his father's manuscripts the collection of responsa Tzemach Tzedek (Altdorf, 1775). Often it is mistakenly catalogued as being printed in Amsterdam due to the Hebrew acronym.

== Jewish Encyclopedia bibliography ==
- Landshuth, Ammudei ha-'Avodah, p. 187;
- Horodetzky, in Ha-Goren, ii.32;
- Dembitzer, Kelilat Yofi, ii.143b;
- Frankl-Grün, Gesch. der Juden in Kremsier, i.89;
- Kaufmann Gedenkbuch, p. 373
