= Aberbach =

Aberbach is a surname of German and Jiddish origin. It is mostly a variant of Auerbach that probably stems from its Hebrew spelling (אברבך) with the letter Beth that can be read a "v" or as "b". Notable people with the surname include:

- Jean Aberbach (1910–1992), Austrian-born American music publisher
- Julian Aberbach (1909–2004), Austrian-born American music publisher

== See also ==
- Auerbach (Jewish family)
