= Felix Auerbach =

German physicist (1856–1933)

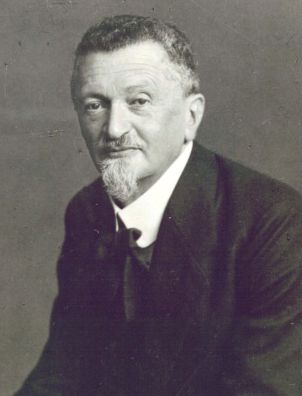
- Auerbach during his time at the Jena Institute of Theoretical Physics
- Born: 12 November 1856
- Died: 26 February 1933 (aged 76)
- Occupation: Physicist
- Father: Leopold Auerbach
- Relatives: Friedrich Auerbach (brother)

Felix Auerbach (12 November 1856 – 26 February 1933) was a German physicist.

== Life ==
Auerbach was born in Breslau (today Wrocław) on 12 November 1856. His father, Leopold Auerbach, was a respected physician and professor of medicine at the University of Breslau. His mother was Arabella Auerbach, née Hess. From her, he acquired the talent and love for music that accompanied him throughout his life. Felix was the eldest of six siblings. The chemist, Friedrich Auerbach (1870–1925), and Wroclaw pianist, Max Auerbach (born 1872) were his younger brothers.

Auerbach received his humanistic education from 1865 to 1873 at Mary Magdalene School in his home town. After leaving school, at the age of 16, he went to study at the universities of Breslau, Heidelberg - with Gustav Robert Kirchhoff - and Berlin - with Hermann Helmholtz. Under Helmholtz, he received his doctorate in 1875. The title of his dissertation The nature of vocal sounds demonstrated his interest in the physics of music and acoustics. In 1879, Felix Auerbach became an assistant to Oskar Emil Meyer at the physics department of the University of Wroclaw and in 1880 he became a lecturer there.

In 1883, Auerbach married Anna Silbergleit (1860–1933), later a board member of the Central German Women's Union and campaigner for women's suffrage. The marriage remained childless.

In 1889, Auerbach took over the professorship of theoretical physics at the University of Jena which had been established by Ernst Abbe. As a Jew he was initially refused a full professorship; it was not until 1923 that this was granted to him. He became professor emeritus in 1927.

From 1906 to about 1914, with his sister-in-law, Käthe Auerbach (1871–1940), he took on the education of the children of his brother, Max Auerbach: Klaus, Günther, Johannes and Cornelia (later wife of Hanning Schröder).

== Artistic salon ==
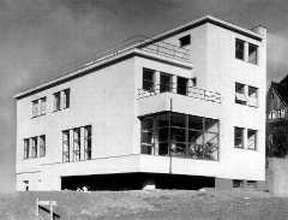
The Haus Auerbach

By 1914, Auerbach was already a patron of the Jena art scene. Numerous artists such as Erich Kuithan, Clara Harnack (the widow of Otto Harnack), Reinhard Sorge, Eberhard Grisebach and Botho Graef, the sponsor of Ernst Ludwig Kirchner, frequented his house. In Jena, he supported the progressive aspirations of the Jena Art Association and the Weimar Bauhaus. In 1925, Walter Gropius built a house on the principle of "large-scale building blocks" for Auerbach and his wife. The Auerbach House, as it is still called today, was restored in 1995. Until 1933, it was a cultural centre for artists and scientists. Besides Gropius, Max Bruch, Ida and Richard Dehmel, Edvard Munch, Henry van de Velde and Julius Meier-Graefe were among Auerbach's frequent guests and friends. As early as 1906, Munch had painted a portrait of Felix Auerbach (now in the Van Gogh Museum, Amsterdam).

== Death ==
The rise of Adolf Hitler and the anti-Semitic climate in Germany made life unbearable for Felix and Anna Auerbach. After the Nazis seized power, both took their own lives. In his suicide note he stated that they "left the earthly life full of joy, after nearly 50 years of mutually blissful cohabitation". They died in Jena on 26 February 1933.

== Works ==
Auerbach was a versatile scientist who never lost sight of the practical. At the University of Jena, he specialised in experimental physics. He worked on magnetism, which was also the topic of his habilitation thesis. He wrote a treatise on hydrodynamics for the Venetian Academy of Sciences. He also investigated the hardness of solid materials and in 1890 developed an instrument to measure absolute hardness.

Horst Bredekamp made mention in Die Zeit that the art historian Ulrich Müller had written that the Jena Professor of Physics, Felix Auerbach "was able to explain Einstein's Theory of Relativity in two papers, dated 1906 and 1921, and in particular impressed a number of artists because he had dealt with a physics of the arts for decades." Paul Klee and Wassily Kandinsky, who Gropius had brought in as a teacher at the Bauhaus in Weimar, were two of these artists.

Together with physicist Wilhelm Hort (1878–1938), Auerbach began, as a septuagenarian, the publication of the Handbuch der physikalischen und technischen Mechanik ("Handbook of Physics and Engineering Mechanics", 1927–1931, 7 vols). In addition to his physical work Auerbach had a particular interest in mathematics. One of his classic works was Die Furcht vor der Mathematik und ihre Überwindung ("The Fear of Mathematics and Conquering It", 1925).

In his work Das Gesetz der Bevölkerungskonzentration ("The Law of Population Concentration") Auerbach describes a law relating to the wide distribution of city sizes, which is now known as Zipf's law.

== Selected publications ==
- Untersuchungen über die Natur des Vocalklanges, in: Annalen der Physik und Chemie Ergänzungsbd. 8 (1877), pp. 177–225.
- Bestimmung der Resonanztöne der Mundhöhle durch Percussion, in: Annalen der Physik und Chemie 3 (1878), pp. 152–157
- Über Tonhöhe einer Stimmgabel in einer incompressiblen Flüssigkeit, in: Annalen der Physik und Chemie 3 (1878), pp. 157–160
- Über die Verbreitung stationärer electrischer Ströme in leitenden Flächen, in: Annalen der Physik und Chemie 3 (1878), pp. 498–
- Zur Grassmann’schen Vokaltheorie, in: Annalen der Physik und Chemie 3 (1878), pp. 508-515
- Die Weltherrin und ihr Schatten. Ein Vortrag über Energie und Entropie. G. Fischer, Jena 1902
- Akustik (= Handbuch der Physik 2), Leipzig o.J. (2nd edition 1909).
- Ektropismus und die physikalische Theorie des Lebens. Wilhelm Engelmann, Leipzig 1910
- Die Grundlagen der Musik. J. A. Barth, Leipzig 1911.
- Das Gesetz der Bevölkerungskonzentration. in: Petermanns Geogr. Mitteilungen, 59, pp. 73–76, 1913
- Die graphische Darstellung. Teubner, Leipzig 1914
- Die Physik im Kriege. Gustav Fischer, Jena 1915
- Fernschrift und Fernspruch. Die Überwindung von Raum und Zeit durch Elektrizität. Ullstein, Berlin 1916
- Ernst Abbe – Sein Leben, sein Wirken, seine Persönlichkeit. Akadem. Verlagsgesellschaft, Leipzig 1918
- Wörterbuch der Physik. Walter de Gruyter, Berlin und Leipzig 1920
- Raum und Zeit, Materie und Energie, Eine Einführung in die Relativitätstheorie, Leipzig: Dürr’sche Buchhandlung 1921
- Entwicklungsgeschichte der Modernen Physik: Zugleich eine Übersicht ihrer Tatsachen, Gesetze und Theorien. Julius Springer, Berlin 1923
- Die Furcht vor der Mathematik und ihre Überwindung. Gustav Fischer, 1924
- Das Zeisswerk und die Carl-Zeiss-Stiftung in Jena. Gustav Fischer, Jena 1925, 5th edition
- Die Methoden der theoretischen Physik. Akad. Verlagsges., Leipzig 1925
- Lebendige Mathematik. Eine allgemeinverständliche Einführung in die Schau- und Denkweise der niederen und höheren Mathematik. Ferdinand Hirt, Breslau 1929
