= Wilhelm Hort =

German physicist

Wilhelm Karl Konrad Siegmund Adam Hort (20 March 1878 in Madelungen, now part of Eisenach – 2 June 1938 in Berlin) was a German physicist.

He studied mathematics and physics at the University of Jena, mechanical and electrical engineering at the Technical University of Braunschweig, then completed his studies at the University of Göttingen, where he received a doctorate in physics (1904). In 1917 he received his habilitation at Technische Universität Berlin (TU Berlin) and in 1923 obtained the title of professor.

In 1928, he became head of the department of mechanics at the Heinrich-Hertz-Institut für Schwingungsforschung (Heinrich Hertz Institute of Oscillation Research) in Berlin, and in 1931 returned to TU Berlin as chair of Mechanische Schwingungslehre (mechanical oscillations theory). In 1919, with Georg Gehlhoff, he founded the Deutsche Gesellschaft für technische Physik (German Society for Technical Physics).

== Published works ==
His textbook on vibration theory, Technische Schwingungslehre (1910; expanded edition 1922) was considered to be the main German work on this subject for three decades. His other noteworthy writings are:

- Die Entwicklung des Problems der stetigen Kraftmaschinenreglung nebst einem Versuch der Theorie unstetiger Reglugsvorgange, (1904).
- Die differentialgleichungen des ingenieurs, (1914) – Differential equations for the engineer.
- Handbuch der physikalischen und technischen Mechanik, (1927) (with Felix Auerbach) – Handbook of physical and technical mechanics.
- Die Differentialgleichungen der Technik und Physik, 3rd edition, 1939 (with Wilhelm Thoma) – Differential equations of engineering and physics.
