= J. M. Robson =

British geneticist (1900–1982)

John Michael ‘Rab’ Robson
- Born: 31 December 1900; Belgium
- Died: 18 February 1982 (aged 81); London, England
- Education: University of Leeds
- Known for: Mutagenesis
- Scientific career
- Fields: medicine genetics
- Workplaces: University of Edinburgh; Guy's Hospital Medical School; National Research Council of Canada

John Michael 'Rab' Rabinovich FRSE FRCS FRCSE LLD (1900–1982)) was a geneticist who co-founded the science of mutagenesis by mutations in fruit flies exposed to mustard gas. He was Professor at Guy's Hospital Medical School.

== Life ==
Born in Belgium to a Russian-Jewish family on 31 December 1900 (according to the Royal Society of Edinburgh), Rabinovich came prior to World War I in England, where he attended school in Leeds and graduated with a BSc in 1925.

In 1940, along with Charlotte Auerbach and A.J. Clark, he discovered that mustard gas could cause mutations in fruit flies, founding the science of mutagenesis. He continued earlier research on sex hormones when he moved to the Pharmacology Department of Guy's Hospital Medical School, London in 1946, but grew more interested in the similar effects of exposure to mustard gas with exposure to X-rays. Robson's pharmacological research paved the way for the development of the contraceptive pill in the 1960s. While there he undertook research on the effects of gonadotrophins in pregnancy, and also supervised the Pregnancy Diagnosis Station that had been founded by the Institute's director Professor Francis Crew.

In 1932, he received an honorary doctorate (DSc) from the University of Edinburgh, and was elected a Fellow of the Royal Society of Edinburgh. His proposers were Francis Albert Eley Crew, Bertold Wiesner, Alan William Greenwood, and Sir Edward Albert Sharpey-Schafer.

In 1946, he moved to London as a Reader in Pharmacology at Guy's Hospital Medical School, and was given a professorship there in 1950. Here he focussed upon endocrinology.

He retired in 1968, and was made Emeritus Professor at Guys. He died in London on 18 February 1982 aged 81.

== Publications ==
- Recent Advances in Sex and Reproductive Physiology (1934)
- Recent Advances in Pharmacology (1950)

== Family ==
Robson married Sarah Benjamin in September 1930 in Leeds.
