= Menahem Mendel Auerbach =

Austrian banker and rabbi

Menahem Mendel ben Meshullam Auerbach (1620 – July 8, 1689) (Hebrew: מנחם מענדל אויערבאך) was an Austrian rabbi, banker, and commentator born in Vienna at the beginning of the 17th century. He was descended from the well-known Auerbach-Fischhof family, both his father, Meshullam Solomon, and his maternal grandfather, Rabbi Judah Loeb Rofe, being members of the Vienna Ghetto.

== Biography ==
Auerbach received a Talmudic education, and was a pupil of Yoel Sirkes (ב"ח), of Joshua Höschel ben Joseph of Kraków, and of Menahem Mendel Krochmal of Nikolsburg. He married the daughter of Judah Loeb Cohn of Kraków (died 1645), and then settled in Kraków, being at the same time engaged in the banking business with his brother. Later, both returned to Vienna, where Menahem remained after his brother's death in 1666, up to the expulsion of the Jews from Vienna by the emperor Leopold I in 1670. Benjamin Leb (Wolf) Fischhof, probably the youngest of the brothers, was also expelled at the same time, and became rabbi in Nikolsburg.

After the expulsion, Auerbach became rabbi at Rausnitz, Moravia, and in 1673 of Krotoszyn, where for sixteen years and until his death he occupied the double position of rabbi and parnass of the district of Posen. In Krotoszyn he established a yeshibah, which soon became known throughout Poland, and to which he devoted much of his time and energy (Eliakim ben Meir, Responsa, § 61). His son Moses was parnass of the district of Posen, one of the leaders of the Synod of Great Poland, and president of the Assembly of Kobylin in 1733. Menahem Mendel died at Krotoszyn, Posen, July 8, 1689.

== Works ==
Auerbach was the author of Ateret Zekenim (The Crown of Old Men; compare Proverbs xvii. 6), a commentary on Oraḥ Ḥayyim, a division of the Shulhan Aruk, printed at Dyhernfurth, 1720, and republished in most editions of that work. He also left in manuscript Akeret ha-Bayit (The Barren One of the House; compare Psalms cxiii. 9), a commentary on another division of the Shulḥan Aruk; namely, Ḥoshen Mishpaṭ.

== Jewish Encyclopedia bibliography ==
- Kaufmann, Die Letzte Vertreibung der Juden aus Wien, pp. 172 et seq., Vienna, 1889;
- Haim Nathan Dembitzer, Kelilat Yofi, passim, Cracow, 1888;
- I. Eisenstadt-S. Wiener, Da'at ḳedoshim, passim, St. Petersburg, 1897-98.
