= Mutagenesis =

Biological process

Mutagenesis (/mjuːtəˈdʒɛnɪsɪs/) is a process by which the genetic information of an organism is changed by the production of a mutation. It may occur spontaneously in nature, or as a result of exposure to mutagens. It can also be achieved experimentally using laboratory procedures. A mutagen is a mutation-causing agent, be it chemical or physical, which results in an increased rate of mutations in an organism's genetic code. In nature, mutagenesis can lead to cancer and various heritable diseases, and it is also a driving force of evolution. Mutagenesis as a science was developed based on work done by Hermann Muller, Charlotte Auerbach and J. M. Robson in the first half of the 20th century.

== History ==
DNA may be modified, either naturally or artificially, by a number of physical, chemical and biological agents, resulting in mutations. Hermann Muller found that "high temperatures" have the ability to mutate genes in the early 1920s, and in 1927, demonstrated a causal link to mutation upon experimenting with an x-ray machine, noting phylogenetic changes when irradiating fruit flies with relatively high dose of X-rays. Muller observed a number of chromosome rearrangements in his experiments, and suggested mutation as a cause of cancer. The association of exposure to radiation and cancer had been observed as early as 1902, six years after the discovery of X-ray by Wilhelm Röntgen, and the discovery of radioactivity by Henri Becquerel. Lewis Stadler, Muller's contemporary, also showed the effect of X-rays on mutations in barley in 1928, and of ultraviolet (UV) radiation on maize in 1936. In 1940s, Charlotte Auerbach and J. M. Robson found that mustard gas can also cause mutations in fruit flies.

While changes to the chromosome caused by X-ray and mustard gas were readily observable to early researchers, other changes to the DNA induced by other mutagens were not so easily observable; the mechanism by which they occur may be complex, and take longer to unravel. For example, soot was suggested to be a cause of cancer as early as 1775, and coal tar was demonstrated to cause cancer in 1915. The chemicals involved in both were later shown to be polycyclic aromatic hydrocarbons (PAH). PAHs by themselves are not carcinogenic, and it was proposed in 1950 that the carcinogenic forms of PAHs are the oxides produced as metabolites from cellular processes. The metabolic process was identified in 1960s as catalysis by cytochrome P450, which produces reactive species that can interact with the DNA to form adducts, or product molecules resulting from the reaction of DNA and, in this case, cytochrome P450; the mechanism by which the PAH adducts give rise to mutation, however, is still under investigation.

== Distinction between a mutation and DNA damage ==
DNA damage is an abnormal alteration in the structure of DNA that cannot, itself, be replicated when DNA replicates. In contrast, a mutation is a change in the nucleic acid sequence that can be replicated; hence, a mutation can be inherited from one generation to the next. Damage can occur from chemical addition (adduct), or structural disruption to a base of DNA (creating an abnormal nucleotide or nucleotide fragment), or a break in one or both DNA strands. Such DNA damage may result in mutation. When DNA containing damage is replicated, an incorrect base may be inserted in the new complementary strand as it is being synthesized (see DNA repair § Translesion synthesis). The incorrect insertion in the new strand will occur opposite the damaged site in the template strand, and this incorrect insertion can become a mutation (i.e. a changed base pair) in the next round of replication. Furthermore, double-strand breaks in DNA may be repaired by an inaccurate repair process, non-homologous end joining, which produces mutations. Mutations can ordinarily be avoided if accurate DNA repair systems recognize DNA damage and repair it prior to completion of the next round of replication. At least 169 enzymes are either directly employed in DNA repair or influence DNA repair processes. Of these, 83 are directly employed in the 5 types of DNA repair processes indicated in the chart shown in the article DNA repair.

Mammalian nuclear DNA may sustain more than 60,000 damage episodes per cell per day, as listed with references in DNA damage (naturally occurring). If left uncorrected, these adducts, after misreplication past the damaged sites, can give rise to mutations. In nature, the mutations that arise may be beneficial or deleterious—this is the driving force of evolution. An organism may acquire new traits through genetic mutation, but mutation may also result in impaired function of the genes and, in severe cases, causes the death of the organism. Mutation is also a major source for acquisition of resistance to antibiotics in bacteria, and to antifungal agents in yeasts and molds. In a laboratory setting, mutagenesis is a useful technique for generating mutations that allows the functions of genes and gene products to be examined in detail, producing proteins with improved characteristics or novel functions, as well as mutant strains with useful properties. Initially, the ability of radiation and chemical mutagens to cause mutation was exploited to generate random mutations, but later techniques were developed to introduce specific mutations.

In humans, an average of 60 new mutations are transmitted from parent to offspring. Human males, however, tend to pass on more mutations depending on their age, transmitting an average of two new mutations to their progeny with every additional year of their age.

== Mechanisms ==
Mutagenesis may occur endogenously (e.g. spontaneous hydrolysis), through normal cellular processes that can generate reactive oxygen species and DNA adducts, or through error in DNA replication and repair. Mutagenesis may also occur as a result of the presence of environmental mutagens that induce changes to an organism's DNA, like radiation and/or radioactivity. The mechanism by which mutation occurs varies according to the mutagen, or the causative agent, involved. Most mutagens act either directly, or indirectly via mutagenic metabolites, on an organism's DNA, producing lesions. Some mutagens, however, may affect the replication or chromosomal partition mechanism, and other cellular processes.

Mutagenesis may also be self-induced by unicellular organisms when environmental conditions are restrictive to the organism's growth, such as bacteria growing in the presence of antibiotics, yeast growing in the presence of an antifungal agent, or other unicellular organisms growing in an environment lacking in an essential nutrient

Many chemical mutagens require biological activation to become mutagenic. An important group of enzymes involved in the generation of mutagenic metabolites is cytochrome P450. Other enzymes that may also produce mutagenic metabolites include glutathione S-transferase and microsomal epoxide hydrolase. Mutagens that are not mutagenic by themselves but require biological activation are called promutagens.

While most mutagens produce effects that ultimately result in errors in replication, for example creating adducts that interfere with replication, some mutagens may directly affect the replication process or reduce its fidelity. Base analog such as 5-bromouracil may substitute for thymine in replication. Metals such as cadmium, chromium, and nickel can increase mutagenesis in a number of ways in addition to direct DNA damage, for example reducing the ability to repair errors, as well as producing epigenetic changes.

Mutations often arise as a result of problems caused by DNA lesions during replication, resulting in errors in replication. In bacteria, extensive damage to DNA due to mutagens results in single-stranded DNA gaps during replication. This induces the SOS response, an emergency repair process that is also error-prone, thereby generating mutations. In mammalian cells, stalling of replication at damaged sites induces a number of rescue mechanisms that help bypass DNA lesions, however, this may also result in errors. The Y family of DNA polymerases specializes in DNA lesion bypass in a process termed translesion synthesis (TLS) whereby these lesion-bypass polymerases replace the stalled high-fidelity replicative DNA polymerase, transit the lesion and extend the DNA until the lesion has been passed so that normal replication can resume; these processes may be error-prone or error-free.

== Endogenous DNA damage ==
Endogenous DNA damage is caused by internal cellular processes rather than external agents. Cellular processes can generate reactive oxygen species that can modify the DNA, and DNA can also undergo spontaneous hydrolysis, while errors in replication can result in mutations.

=== DNA damage and spontaneous mutation ===
The number of DNA damage episodes occurring in a mammalian cell per day is high (more than 60,000 per day). Frequent occurrence of DNA damage is likely a problem for all DNA- containing organisms, and the need to cope with DNA damage and minimize their deleterious effects is likely a fundamental problem for life.

Most spontaneous mutations likely arise from error-prone trans-lesion synthesis past a DNA damage site in the template strand during DNA replication. This process can overcome potentially lethal blockages, but at the cost of introducing inaccuracies in daughter DNA. The causal relationship of DNA damage to spontaneous mutation is illustrated by aerobically growing E. coli bacteria, in which 89% of spontaneously occurring base substitution mutations are caused by DNA damage induced by reactive oxygen species. In yeast, more than 60% of spontaneous single-base pair substitutions and deletions are likely caused by trans-lesion synthesis.

An additional significant source of mutations in eukaryotes is the inaccurate DNA repair process non-homologous end joining, that is often employed in repair of double strand breaks.

In general, it appears that the main underlying cause of spontaneous mutation is error-prone trans-lesion synthesis during DNA replication and that the error-prone non-homologous end-joining repair pathway may also be an important contributor in eukaryotes.

=== Reactive oxygen species and oxidative damages ===
Reactive oxygen species is the typical byproducts of the electron transport chain during cellular respiration. Low levels of reactive oxygen species can function in cellular signaling and immune defenses, but excessive levels of reactive oxygen species can damage bases and the sugar phosphate backbone of the DNA. 8-oxo-guanine, an oxidized formed of guanine mispair with Adenine during replication instead of cytosine, causing an G:C to T:A mutation if left unrepaired.

=== Spontaneous hydrolysis ===
==== Base deamination ====
Base deamination is a major source of spontaneous mutagenesis happening in the human cells, and it is the loss of amine groups from a DNA base such as cytosine (C), adenine (A), guanine(G), and 5-methylcytosine. It changes the base pairing behavior so that cytosine (C) becomes Uracil (U) , adenine(A) becomes hypoxanthine, guanine (G) becomes xanthine, and 5-methylcytosine becomes thymine (T).

Cytosine and 5-methylcytosine deamination is the most frequently deaminated DNA bases, with 5-methylcytosine being three to four times more deaminated than Cytosine. For cytosine deamination, in DNA, cytosine (C) is usually paired with guanine (G). But after the deamination has happened, it creates a uracil (U) and Guanine (G) mismatch, and if the mismatch is not properly repaired, uracil can pair with adenine, creating a C:G to T:A mutation. While the deamination of 5-methylcytosine generates thymine (T) instead of uracil (U), creating a G:T mismatch.

==== Depurination ====
DNA is not entirely stable in aqueous solution, and depurination of the DNA can occur. Under physiological conditions the glycosidic bond may be hydrolyzed spontaneously and 5000 purine sites in DNA are estimated to be depurinated each day in a cell. Numerous DNA repair pathways exist for DNA; however, if the apurinic site is not repaired, misincorporation of nucleotides may occur during replication. Adenine is preferentially incorporated by DNA polymerases in an apurinic site.

=== Tautomerism ===
Tautomerization is the process by which compounds spontaneously rearrange themselves to assume their structural isomer forms. For example, the keto (C=O) forms of guanine and thymine can rearrange into their rare enol (-OH) forms, while the amino (-NH_{2} ) forms of adenine and cytosine can result in the rarer imino (=NH) forms. In DNA replication, tautomerization alters the base-pairing sites and can cause the improper pairing of nucleic acid bases.

=== Modification of bases ===
Bases may be modified endogenously by normal cellular molecules. For example, DNA may be methylated by S-adenosylmethionine, thus altering the expression of the marked gene without incurring a mutation to the DNA sequence itself. Histone modification is a related process in which the histone proteins around which DNA coils can be similarly modified via methylation, phosphorylation, or acetylation; these modifications may act to alter gene expression of the local DNA, and may also act to denote locations of damaged DNA in need of repair. DNA may also be glycosylated by reducing sugars.

Many compounds, such as PAHs, aromatic amines, aflatoxin and pyrrolizidine alkaloids, may form reactive oxygen species catalyzed by cytochrome P450. These metabolites form adducts with the DNA, which can cause errors in replication, and the bulky aromatic adducts may form stable intercalation between bases and block replication. The adducts may also induce conformational changes in the DNA. Some adducts may also result in the depurination of the DNA; it is, however, uncertain how significant such depurination as caused by the adducts is in generating mutation.

Alkylation and arylation of bases can cause errors in replication. Some alkylating agents such as N-nitrosamines may require the catalytic reaction of cytochrome-P450 for the formation of a reactive alkyl cation. N^{7} and O^{6} of guanine and the N^{3} and N^{7} of adenine are most susceptible to attack. N^{7}-guanine adducts form the bulk of DNA adducts, but they appear to be non-mutagenic. Alkylation at O^{6} of guanine, however, is harmful because excision repair of O^{6}-adduct of guanine may be poor in some tissues such as the brain. The O^{6} methylation of guanine can result in G to A transition, while O^{4}-methylthymine can be mispaired with guanine. The type of the mutation generated, however, may be dependent on the size and type of the adduct as well as the DNA sequence.

Ionizing radiation and reactive oxygen species often oxidize guanine to produce 8-oxoguanine.

== Exogenous DNA damage ==
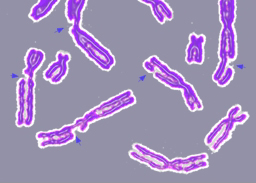
Arrows indicates chromosomal breakages due to DNA damage.

Exogenous DNA damage is structural alteration of DNA caused by external environmental agents, including UV radiation, ionizing radiation, and chemical toxins.

=== Backbone damage ===
Ionizing radiation may produce highly reactive free radicals that can break the bonds in the DNA. Double-stranded breakages are especially damaging and hard to repair, producing translocation and deletion of part of a chromosome. Alkylating agents like mustard gas, diet, tobacco smoke may also cause breakages in the DNA backbone. Endogenous processes may also such as oxidative stress may also generate highly reactive oxygen species that can damage the DNA.

=== Crosslinking ===
Covalent bonds between the bases of nucleotides in DNA, be they in the same strand or opposing strands, is referred to as crosslinking of DNA; crosslinking of DNA may affect both the replication and the transcription of DNA, and it may be caused by exposure to a variety of agents. Some naturally occurring chemicals may also promote crosslinking, such as psoralens after activation by UV radiation, and nitrous acid. Interstrand cross-linking (between two strands) causes more damage, as it blocks replication and transcription and can cause chromosomal breakages and rearrangements. Some crosslinkers such as cyclophosphamide, mitomycin C and cisplatin are used as anticancer chemotherapeutic because of their high degree of toxicity to proliferating cells.

=== Dimerization ===
Dimerization consists of the bonding of two monomers to form an oligomer, such as the formation of pyrimidine dimers as a result of exposure to UV radiation, which promotes the formation of a cyclobutyl ring between adjacent thymines in DNA . These bulky bases would cause a distortion in the DNA helixes and can interfere with DNA replication and transcription. In human skin cells, thousands of dimers may be formed in a day due to normal exposure to sunlight. DNA polymerase η may help bypass these lesions in an error-free manner; however, individuals with defective DNA repair function, such as those with xeroderma pigmentosum, are sensitive to sunlight and may be prone to skin cancer.

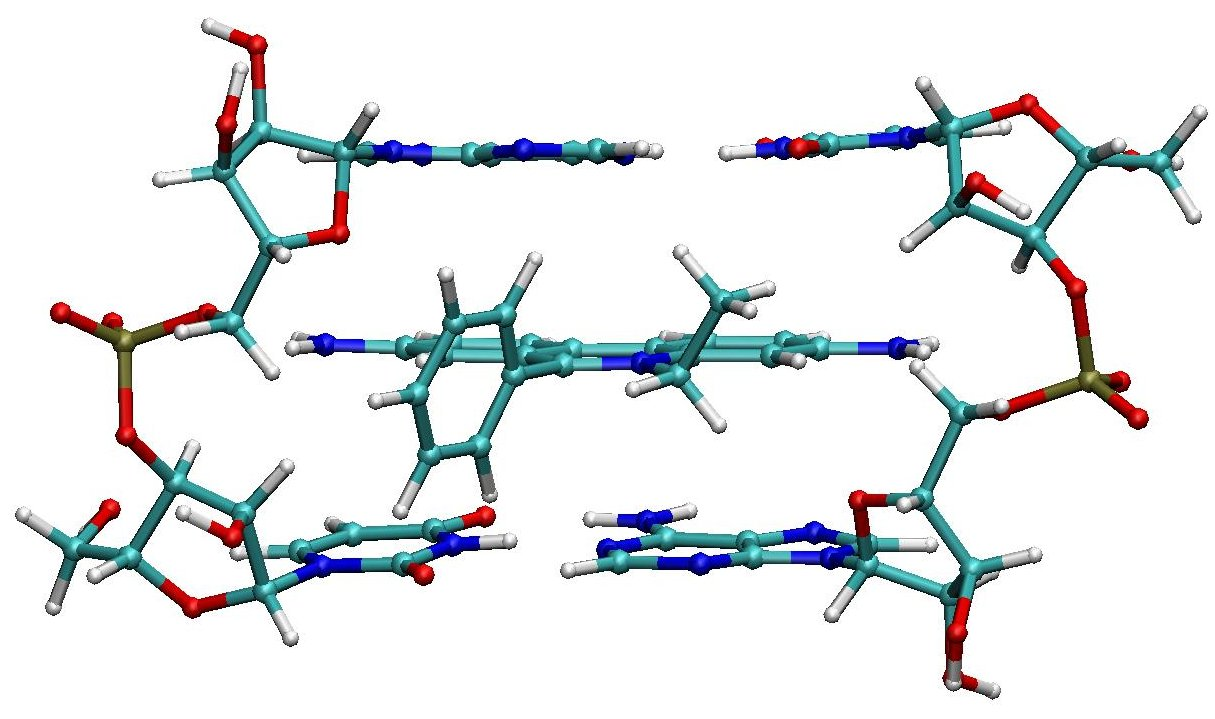
Ethidium intercalated between two adenine-thymine base pairs

Clinically, whether a tumor has formed as a direct consequence of UV radiation is discernible via DNA sequencing analysis for the characteristic context-specific dimerization pattern that occurs due to excessive exposure to sunlight.

=== Intercalation between bases ===
The planar structure of chemicals such as ethidium bromide and proflavine allows them to insert between bases in DNA. This insert causes the DNA's backbone to stretch and makes slippage in DNA during replication more likely to occur since the bonding between the strands is made less stable by the stretching. Forward slippage will result in deletion mutation, while reverse slippage will result in an insertion mutation. Also, the intercalation into DNA of anthracyclines such as daunorubicin and doxorubicin interferes with the functioning of the enzyme topoisomerase II, blocking replication as well as causing mitotic homologous recombination.

=== Insertional mutagenesis ===
Transposons and viruses or retrotransposons may insert DNA sequences into coding regions or functional elements of a gene and result in inactivation of the gene.

== DNA repair pathway ==
DNA damage happens frequently, but DNA damage does not always become a mutation. Only after the repair mechanism has failed or inaccurate, allowing the damages to bypass then the mutation would happen, and potentially lead to diseases like cancer.

=== Base excision repair ===
Base excision repair corrects the small, non-helix distorting lesions of DNA helix such as oxidative, deaminated, alkylation, as well as basic single abase damages. DNA glycosylase within the base excision repair mechanism recognizes those damages and cleaves the N-glycosidic bond, leave behind an abasic sites. DNA backbone would then be cut at that site by AP endonuclease, after that DNA polymerase fills the gap.

=== Nucleotide excision repair ===
Nucleotide excision repair removes bulky lesion such as CPDs and (6-4) pp from UV radiation, or damage from chemotherapeutic agents. There are two major branches of nucleotide excision repair: Globular genome nucleotide excision repair and transcription-coupled nucleotide excision repair. Globular Genome NER, the XPC, RAD23B and CETN2 protein complex scans for whole genome damage, once the damage is found, endonuclease such as XPF–ERCC1 and XPG will cut out the lesion from 5' to 3', and POL ε or XRCC1–LIG3 will carry out the gap filling synthesis and ligation.

=== Mismatch repair ===
Mismatch repair removes base mismatch that have arisen during replication and the insertion-deletion loop. Humans employ the MutSα heterodimer (MSH2/MSH6) to recognize the base mismatch. Once the mismatch is found, Exo1 carries out the 5' directed mismatch excision, which creates a gap later being filled by Polδ, RFC, and HMGB.

== Adaptive mutagenesis mechanisms ==
Adaptive mutagenesis has been defined as mutagenesis mechanisms that enable an organism to adapt to an environmental stress. Since the variety of environmental stresses is very broad, the mechanisms that enable it are also quite broad, as far as research on the field has shown. For instance, in bacteria, while modulation of the SOS response and endogenous prophage DNA synthesis has been shown to increase Acinetobacter baumannii resistance to ciprofloxacin. Resistance mechanisms are presumed to be linked to chromosomal mutation untransferable via horizontal gene transfer in some members of family Enterobacteriaceae, such as E. coli, Salmonella spp., Klebsiella spp., and Enterobacter spp. Chromosomal events, specially gene amplification, seem also to be relevant to this adaptive mutagenesis in bacteria.

Research in eukaryotic cells is much scarcer, but chromosomal events seem also to be rather relevant: while an ectopic intrachromosomal recombination has been reported to be involved in acquisition of resistance to 5-fluorocytosine in Saccharomyces cerevisiae, genome duplications have been found to confer resistance in S. cerevisiae to nutrient-poor environments.

== Laboratory applications ==
In the laboratory, mutagenesis is a technique by which DNA mutations are deliberately engineered to produce mutant genes, proteins, or strains of organisms. Various constituents of a gene, such as its control elements and its gene product, may be mutated so that the function of a gene or protein can be examined in detail. The mutation may also produce mutant proteins with altered properties, or enhanced or novel functions that may prove to be of use commercially. Mutant strains of organisms that have practical applications, or allow the molecular basis of particular cell function to be investigated, may also be produced.

Early methods of mutagenesis produced entirely random mutations; however, modern methods of mutagenesis are capable of producing site-specific mutations. Modern laboratory techniques used to generate these mutations include:

- Directed mutagenesis
- Site-directed mutagenesis/ PCR mutagenesis
- Insertional mutagenesis
- Signature tagged mutagenesis
- Transposon mutagenesis
- Sequence saturation mutagenesis

== See also ==
- Carcinogenesis
- DNA damage (naturally occurring)
- DNA repair
- Dysgenics
- Mutagen
- Mutation
- Mutation breeding
- Mutation rate
- Transfection
