= Ella Auerbach =

German-born American lawyer

- Born: 15 January 1900; Frankfurt am Main, German Empire
- Died: 20 April 1999 (aged 99); New York City, United States
- Occupations: Lawyer, social worker
- Spouse: Richard Auerbach (m. 1924)
- Children: Brigitte Auerbach; Robert Auerbach

Ella Auerbach (January 15, 1900 in Frankfurt am Main – April 20, 1999 in New York) was one of the first female German lawyers.

== Early life and family ==
Auerbach's father was a respected family judge in Frankfurt am Main. Her grandfather and great-grandfather were also lawyers, and apparently even earlier ancestors as well. Her mother was a professional violinist, serving as concertmaster at one of the major Frankfurt orchestras, and also performing in chamber music groups.

== Education ==
In her junior year in gymnasium (high school), in 1917, the principal used the occasion of a school assembly to espouse right-wing ultranationalist views. Auerbach was the only student to get up in protest and leave the assembly. As a result, she was withdrawn from that school and instead enrolled in the Odenwald Schule, an ultraliberal avant-garde school which transitioned temporarily as the Ecole de Humanité in Switzerland during WWII.

Her earliest law courses were attended surreptitiously, as women were not then allowed to do so. Later, when women were allowed to attend law classes, she officially attended her law classes.

== Legal career in Germany ==
On 20 November 1922, Auerbach passed her junior law exam and was sworn in early December 1922 as the first woman in Bad Homburg as a trainee lawyer.

Auerbach met her husband, Richard Auerbach, while finishing her law education in Berlin, and married Richard Auerbach in 1924. After a leave of absence to give birth to Brigitte (1926), she passed her law exams and civic assessor appointment. Auerbach wanted at least one more child, but her husband (also a Berlin attorney) convinced her that a second child would be a reward for completing the further training to become admitted to the Berlin appellate court (Note: since Berlin was the capital and there was no court level higher than the appellate court, the Berlin appellate court was considered to be the Supreme Court). Auerbach was admitted to the Berlin appellate court in 1928, and her second child, Robert, was born in April 1929).

== Persecution and emigration ==
Auerbach, along with other Jewish professionals, was barred from practicing law in 1933 (her husband Richard was allowed to practice until 1935 as he held an Iron Cross award from service to the Kaiser in World War I).

While Auerbach (and the two children) were eligible for exit visas to the United States, Richard was not, as he was born in Posen (a German city at the time), but subsequently becoming Polish after World War I and renamed Poznan. American immigration laws drastically limited the number of Polish immigrants, and American immigration officials defined Richard as Polish.

As a result, the family fled to England, arriving there in 1939. After one year, they then immigrated to America.

== Career in the United States ==
Both Ella and Richard Auerbach could not readily transition to the practice of law in the United States, in part because they were trained in civil law rather than English common law. Lawyers trained in English Common Law were more readily admitted to the US bar, whereas lawyers educated in civil law were required to go back to law school for several years. With two children to support, this was not practical.

Thus, Auerbach studied typing and shorthand and was able to get a position at Selfhelp (at roughly $12.00/day). Selfhelp for German Immigrants was founded in 1936 by Paul Tillich, and when Auerbach joined Selfhelp in 1940, there were fewer than 10 paid employees.

When Selfhelp became registered in New York City as a social agency, Auerbach had to become certified as a social worker, so she took additional courses at the New York School of Social Work (Columbia University) for three years. Auerbach continued as a social worker at Selfhelp well into her 80s. Richard, while in England, took accounting classes by correspondence from the Scranton PA School of Business, got a junior accounting position when he arrived in the United States, took night classes at New York University, and became a CPA.

== Community involvement ==
In her first year at Selfhelp, Ella worked to get CARE packages to the Theresienstadt concentration camp in Germany and to the Camp de Gure in France. She became a member of the Boards of both Selfhelp and the American Federation of Jews from Central Europe, as well as on the Board of Congregation Habonim in NYC, the largest Conservative congregation in New York. Auerbach became president of the Sisterhood of the New York community Habonim, was a member of the women's group of the Leo Baeck Institute for many years and was a member of the American Federation of Jews from Central Europe.
