= Ulrich Müller =

German chemist (born 1940)

Ulrich Müller (born 6 July 1940 in Bogotá) is a German chemist who is known for his works on solid-state chemistry and the application of crystallographic group theory to crystal chemistry. He is the author of several textbooks on chemistry, solid-state chemistry, and crystallography.

== Life ==
Müller studied chemistry at the University of Stuttgart from 1959 to 1963. He worked on his dissertation at the Purdue University and the University of Stuttgart. He finished it in 1966 in the group of Kurt Dehnicke. From 1967 to 1970, he worked in the group of Hartmut Bärnighausen at the University of Marburg. In 1972, he finished his habilitation. From 1972 to 1975, Müller was a professor for inorganic chemistry at the University of Marburg. From 1975 to 1977, he was a guest professor at the University of Costa Rica. Then, several professorships for inorganic chemistry followed: University of Marburg from 1977 to 1992, University of Kassel from 1992 to 1999, and University of Marburg from 2000 to 2005. Since 2005, he has been an emeritus professor.

== Research ==
His research focused on the following topics:

- application of crystallographic group theory in crystal chemistry to investigate structural relationships of crystalline solids and to predict possible structure types for inorganic compounds
- synthesis of thio, polysulfido, and polyselenido complexes
- structural analysis of crystalline solids with X-ray diffraction

== Awards ==
He was awarded the Literaturpreis des Fonds der chemischen Industrie for his textbook "Anorganische Strukturchemie" (engl. Inorganic Structural Chemistry).

== Publications ==
- Weidlein, Johann; Dehnicke, Kurt; Müller, Ulrich (1988). Schwingungsspektroskopie: eine Einführung (2nd ed.). Stuttgart: Thieme. ISBN 978-3136251027. OCLC 612028648.
- Mortimer, Charles E.; Beck, Johannes; Müller, Ulrich (2015). Chemie: das Basiswissen der Chemie (12. ed.). Stuttgart: Thieme. ISBN 978-3134843125. OCLC 928072732.
- Müller, Ulrich (2008). Anorganische Strukturchemie (6th ed.). Wiesbaden: Vieweg+Teubner Verlag / GWV Fachverlage, Wiesbaden. ISBN 9783834895455. OCLC 311302178.
- Müller, Ulrich (2007). Inorganic structural chemistry (2nd ed.). Chichester, England: Wiley. ISBN 9780470057261. OCLC 180718922.
- Müller, Ulrich (2013). Symmetry relationships between crystal structures: applications of crystallographic group theory in crystal chemistry. Oxford: Oxford University Press. ISBN 9780191648793. OCLC 850179696.
- Müller, Ulrich (2012). Symmetriebeziehungen zwischen verwandten Kristallstrukturen Anwendungen der kristallographischen Gruppentheorie in der Kristallchemie; unter Verwendung von Textvorlagen von Hans Wondratschek und Hartmut Bärnighausen (1. ed.). Wiesbaden: Vieweg + Teubner. ISBN 9783834817990. OCLC 766008905.
