= Meir Auerbach =

Polish-Israeli rabbi (1815–1878)

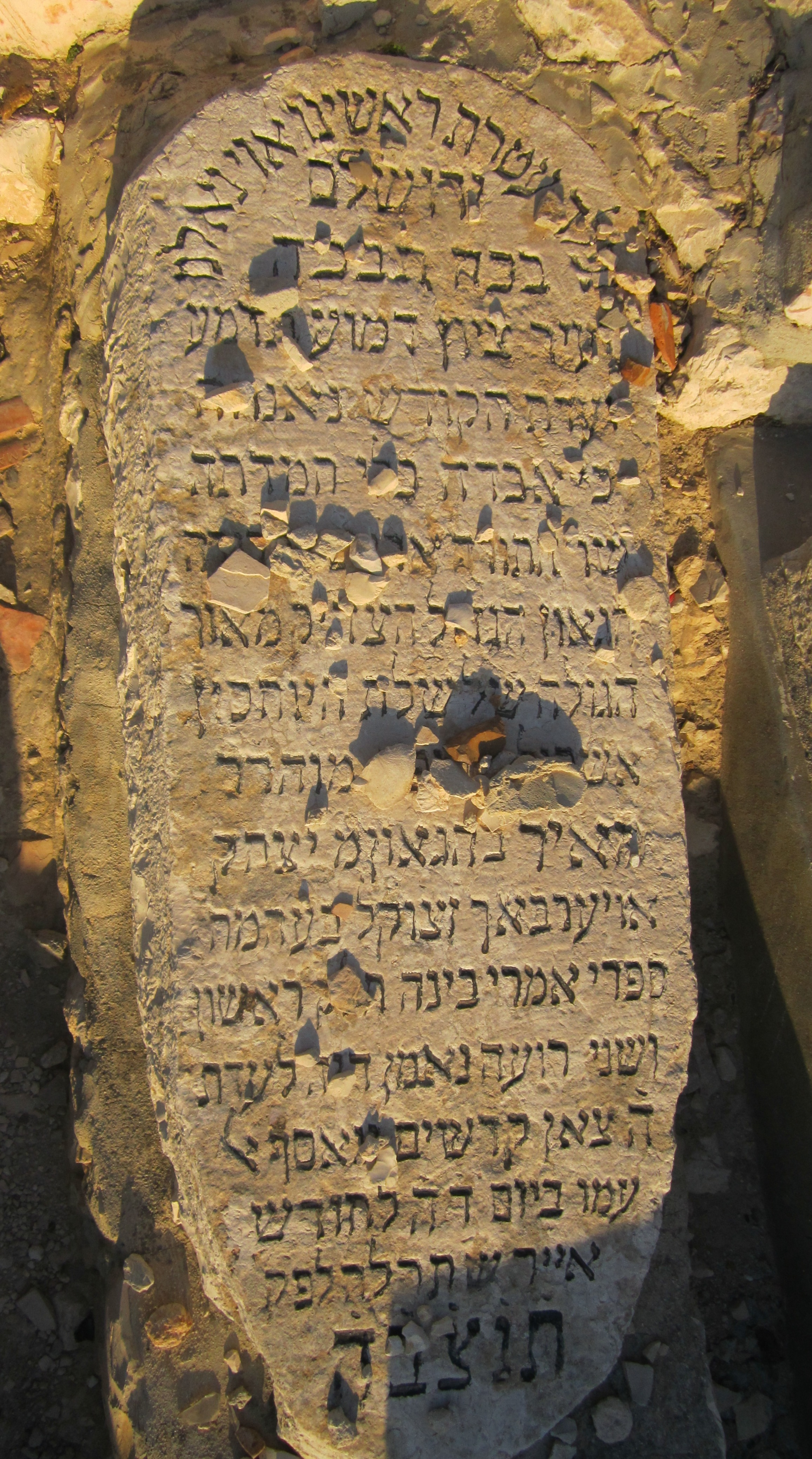
Gravestone of Rabbi Meir Auerbach

Rabbi Meir Auerbach (Hebrew: מאיר אוירבך; 1815–1878) was president of the Jewish court at Koło, and author of Imrei Bina (Words of Wisdom). After his immigration to Ottoman Palestine in 1859, he headed the Poland Kollel and became the first Ashkenazi Chief Rabbi of Jerusalem.

== Biography ==
Meir Auerbach was born in Koło in the Duchy of Warsaw. He was a member of the rabbinic Auerbach family. His father was Rabbi Yitzchak Isaac Auerbach, rabbi of Płock and Luntshitz, author of Divrei Chaim. Auerbach married Hindel of Kalisch. After the death of her husband, Hindel visited his grave on the Mount of Olives together with a group of women. At some point during this outing she disappeared and was never found again. According to rumors, she was seen at a convent.

== Rabbinic career ==
Auerbach became rabbi of his hometown at the age of 25.

In 1846, Auerbach was appointed president of the Jewish beit din in Koło, where he served for nine years. Later he moved to Kalisz, where he served as a rabbi and engaged in commerce. In his sermons, he encouraged members of his congregation to immigrate to Palestine, to "start the process of redemption."

Auerbach left Europe for the Holy Land circa 1860, settling in Jerusalem. His position in Poland was filled by Rabbi Chaim Elozor Wax. He founded a synagogue in the Jewish Quarter of the Old City at the southern end of the Street of the Jews.

Together with Rabbi Shmuel Salant he served in the Jerusalem Chief Rabbinate and took over while Salant went abroad to collect funds.

In Jerusalem, there were many kollels, each working for the benefit of their own communities. There was no umbrella organization to handle general Jewish affairs, such as paying the salaries of rabbis, paying Turkish military taxes, and dealing with Turkish officials. In 1866, Auerbach and Salant organized the first centralized committee to represent the interests of all the Ashkenazim, while the Sephardim managed their affairs under the leadership of the Hakham Bashi of Jerusalem.

Auerbach, who had been a successful merchant in Europe, lived off his personal wealth and refused to accept a salary. He aided many charitable institutions in Jerusalem and was a supporter of Jewish agricultural settlement around the country. He headed a society which attempted to purchase land for settlement in Jericho, a project that was eventually abandoned. Auerbach was one of the founders of Jerusalem's Mea She'arim neighborhood.

== Religious rulings ==
=== Minhag Yerushalayim ===
In his sefer, Imrei Binah, Auerbach promulgated the wedding custom known as Minhag Yerushalayim, which does not permit musical instruments to be played at a wedding in Jerusalem proper in deference to the Holy Temple which lies in ruins in that city. According to this custom, only percussion instruments are allowed. Auerbach's decision was accepted by Rabbi Yosef Chaim Zonnenfeld, Rabbi Yehoshua Leib Diskin, and later Rabbanim of Jerusalem.

=== Kosher etrogs ===
Auerbach and Salant considered the Balady citron, cultivated in the Arab village of Umm el-Fahm, as the most kosher species of etrog.
