= Inge Auerbacher =

American chemist of German origin

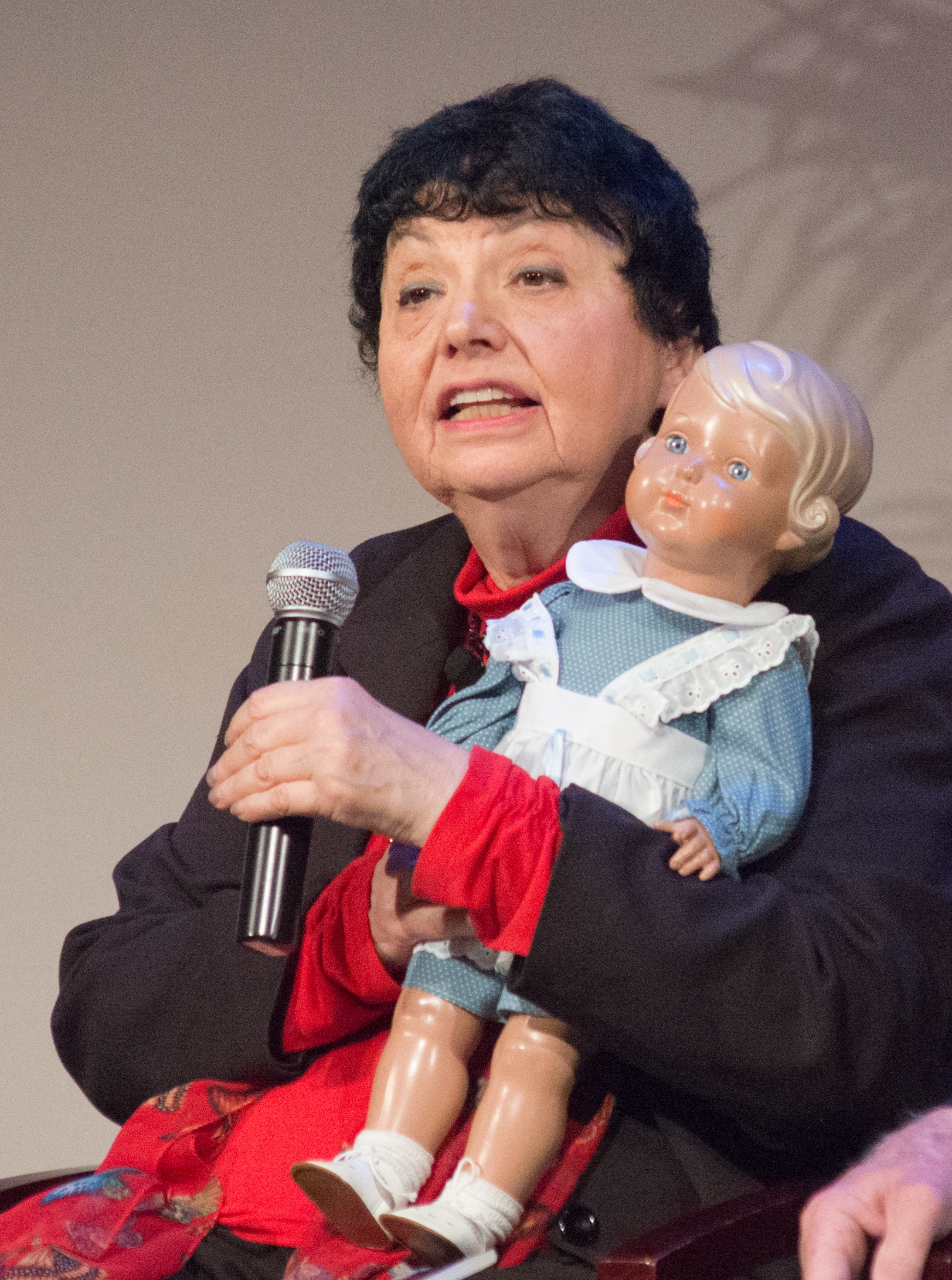
- Born: December 31, 1934 (age 91); Kippenheim, Nazi Germany
- Writing career
- Notable work: I am a Star

Inge Auerbacher (born December 31, 1934) is a German-born American chemist. She is a Holocaust survivor and has published many books about her experiences in the Second World War.

== Early life ==
Inge Auerbacher was the last Jewish child born in Kippenheim in southwestern Germany. She was the only child of Berthold (1898–1987) and Regina Auerbacher (née Lauchheimer, 1905–1996). Both of her parents came from observant Jewish families who had lived for many generations in Germany.

Inge's father was a soldier in the German Army during World War I. He was wounded badly and consequently awarded the Iron Cross for service to his country. Inge's father was a textile merchant and the family owned a large home in Kippenheim.

== The Holocaust ==
On November 10, 1938, her father and grandfather were arrested and taken away during the chaos of Kristallnacht (Night of the Broken Glass) and sent to the Dachau concentration camp. Inge, her mother, and her grandmother were able to hide in a shed during Kristallnacht and were not harmed. A few weeks later Inge's father and grandfather returned home, but her grandfather died shortly after in May 1939 of a heart attack.

Auerbacher spent part of her childhood between the years 1942–1945, when she was sent to a concentration camp.

When Inge was just 7 years old, she was deported with her parents to the Theresienstadt Ghetto in Czechoslovakia. When they arrived, everything they had with them was taken, except for the clothes they were wearing, and Inge's doll, Marlene. Conditions in the concentration camp were very harsh. People were sick and hungry. Potatoes were considered to be as valuable as diamonds. Food was scarce in the camp, Inge was hungry, scared and sick most of the time. Her parents always tried to do what they could for her, with the circumstances they were faced with. For her eighth birthday, her parents gave her a tiny potato cake with a little bit of sugar; for her ninth birthday, an outfit sewn from rags for her doll; and for her tenth birthday, a poem written by her mother.

A total of 140,000 people were shipped to Theresienstadt Ghetto near Terezín; 88,000 were sent primarily to the gas chambers in Auschwitz, and 35,000 died of malnutrition and disease in Terezín. Of the 15,000 children imprisoned in Terezín, Inge and her parents were among the 1% that survived. The Red Army rescued Auerbacher's family on May 8, 1945. After a short stay at Göppingen, the family immigrated to New York City in May 1946. Seven years later Auerbacher obtained US citizenship. She graduated from Queens College and spent 38 years working as a chemist.

== Later life ==
In 1986, Auerbacher published I Am A Star, her first book about her childhood memories. She is the author of six books, including three memoirs about her experiences in Terezín and recovering after the war, and the subject of a play, "The Star on My Heart," which premiered in Ohio in November 2015.

Inge tells her life story in three books; "I am a Star"- Child of the Holocaust, "Beyond the Yellow Star to America" and "Finding Dr. Schatz". These books are about her experiences throughout the Holocaust. These published books are a part of Inge's great accomplishments throughout her life. In the book "I am a Star"- Child of the Holocaust, Inge explains how her life changed once the Nazis invaded. She goes into detail about how all Jews, among her, were required to wear a yellow star on all of their clothing. Moving forward into the book, Ingle explains what it was like in the Concentration Camps. She explains how it was terrible, and they slept on wooden beds altogether. She goes further into detail explaining how awful the food was. Breakfast only consisting of cold coffee and bread, lunch having only cold soup, if any lunch at all, and lastly dinner, which was bread and cold soup. Due to the lack of food many people starved to death.

In 2023, Inge worked with Los Angeles AI company StoryFile and Meta Platforms to create an interactive AI and VR version of her life at Terezín. Users were able to ask Inge questions and her virtual avatar would show them illustrations of her experiences. The project was also backed by World Jewish Congress, UNESCO, and Claims Conference.

== Works ==
- Children of Terror
- Highway to New York
- Running Against the Wind
- Beyond the Yellow Star
- I Am a Star (German: Ich bin ein Stern)
- Finding Dr. Schatz
