= Solomon Heymann Auerbach =

- Born: late 18th century Posen
- Died: 1836; Posen, Grand Duchy of Posen
- Writing career
- Language: German

Solomon Heymann Auerbach (Yiddish: שלמה זלמן בן מיכאל חיים אויערבאך; late 18th century – 1836) was a Hebrew scholar. He translated Habakkuk into German with explanatory notes (Breslau, 1821). He also collaborated in the translation of the Bible undertaken by Leopold Zunz, for which he furnished the translation of Ecclesiastes, on which book he wrote also a Hebrew commentary (Breslau, 1837).

== Publications ==
- Das Buch Habacuc mit einem ebräischen Commentar. Breslau: L. W. Sulzbach. 1821.
- Das Buch Koheleth, neu übersetzt mit einem hebräischen Commentar. Breslau: H. Sulzbach. 1837. hdl:2027/hvd.hw5llt.
