= Benny Dembitzer =

British economist

Benny Dembitzer is a British economist who has specialized in international economic development issues and consequences of climate change, in particular in the economies of sub-Saharan Africa. He is Visiting Professor of Global Economics at the China Centre of University College, London and a Rockefeller Fellow. He has worked for a variety of NGOs and United Nations agencies. His work has taken him to 35 different countries in sub-Saharan Africa, as well as Indonesia, Pakistan, Chile and Brazil. He was director of the European Office of International Physicians for the Prevention of Nuclear War, when the organization was awarded the 1985 Nobel Peace Prize.

== Education and Research ==
Dembitzer graduated from Trinity College, Cambridge University with a BA in economics in 1962, followed by MA in 1965. He studied under Amartya Sen, winner of the 1998 Nobel Prize for Economics for his life-long study of famines across the world. He followed Sen for a brief time as a supervisor in economics at Trinity College. He also studied under Gunnar Myrdal at Uppsala University in 1962 and in 1979 at the IMD Management school linked to the University of Lausanne, where he obtained a postgraduate degree in management studies. He returned to Cambridge in 1964 and was Assistant Registrar of the University, where he remained until 1968.

He subsequently was on the staff of the Economist Intelligence Unit (part of the Economist newspaper) in London for three and a half years, from 1970 to 1973. After some years of international work as a consultant in development economics, he returned to teaching at British universities. Since 1992 he has been Visiting Lecturer in economics at various times at Cranfield, London SouthBank, London Metropolitan, and Greenwich Universities. He is a visiting scholar of the University of Greenwich and Honorary fellow of UNISUL University in Florianopolis (State of Santa Catarina, Brazil), which awarded him an Honorary Doctorate in 2019.

== Work for international organizations and NGOs ==
Over the years he has worked in 35 countries in Africa and 2 in Asia. In 1980-81 he was United Nations Development Programme (UNDP) Adviser to the Handicrafts and Small Scale Industries Development Agency (HASIDA), based in Addis Ababa, Ethiopia with the responsibility of directing the work of 42 different projects across the country. At the Commonwealth Secretariat he was for two years (1981–83) adviser on industrial development to the (then) nine Southern Africa Development Coordination Conference (SADCC) Countries. He travelled frequently to that part of the world.

He has worked for different United Nations agencies – UNDP, International Labour Organization (ILO), United Nations Industrial Development Organization (UNIDO), United Nations Capital Development Fund (UNCDF), International Trade Centre (ITC), World Bank, the British Government’s Department for International Development (DFID), and the Dutch Ministry for International Aid in various parts of the world. He worked for the Aga Khan in Pakistan; for the UNIDO in Ethiopia; in Lesotho for the ITC; Djibouti for the World Bank; Guinea and Indonesia for the UNDP. He also drafted the UNDP five-year economic development plans for both The Gambia and Liberia. For seven years he was economic adviser to the Dutch aid programme in Indonesia. He worked as a consultant for DFID on Fairtrade. In 2003 he worked with UNAIDS in London and Addis Ababa.

Simultaneously, he has worked for various voluntary agencies, including OXFAM in Ethiopia; CARE International in Lesotho; International Voluntary Service in Botswana, Cameroon, Lesotho and Swaziland; War on Want in Cameroon. In the early 1970s he undertook undercover missions for Amnesty International in Gabon, Cameroon and Chad. In 1973 he set up PROJECT HAND, considered the first FairTrade organisation in Britain. He directed the work of the Fund for Research and Investment for the Development of Africa (FRIDA) in twenty African countries from 1975 to 1979. He was European Director of International Physicians for the Prevention of Nuclear War (IPPNW) when it was awarded the Nobel Peace Prize in 1985. That year he became marginally involved with the relief operations kick-started by Bob Geldof in Ethiopia after the Live Aid global concert. In 2004 he organized a conference in Cambridge on corruption in the arms trade for Transparency International, UK. From 1987 to 2006 he ran the annual Global Partnership, an event bringing together some hundreds of British voluntary agencies working in development. During 2007 and 2008 he was economic adviser to Africa Invest, a fund investing in agriculture in Malawi.

In recent years he has been invited to address international conferences and give keynote speeches at various institutions, among others: Encuentros por Chile, the International Association of Chilean scholars (2006), PricewaterhouseCoopers's international development meeting in Washington D.C (2001), the Parliament of the State of Santa Catarina in Brazil (2015), and Cheltenham Ladies' College (2016).
