= Joseph Danziger Auerbach =

Yiddish writer

Joseph Danziger Auerbach (Hebrew: יוסף דנציגר אורבך) was a Yiddish writer. He was the author of Darke Yesharim ('Paths of the Righteous'), a treatise on ethics and morals, published in Amsterdam in 1758.

== Publications ==
- Auerbach, Joseph Danziger (1758). Darke Yesharim (in Yiddish). Amsterdam.
