= Marian Auerbach =

Polish classical philologist

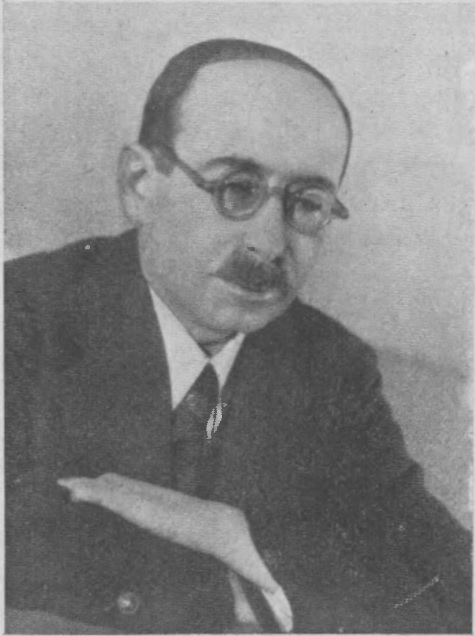
- Marian Auerbach in the 1930s
- Born: 1882
- Died: July 1941 (aged 58–59); Lwów
- Writing career
- Notable works: Greek Grammar, 1935

Marian Auerbach a.k.a. Mayer [Majer] Auerbach (1882 – July 1941, in Lwów) was a Polish classical philologist of Jewish background. He graduated from the Philology Department of the University of Lwów, where he received his doctorate in 1911 and his habilitation in 1932. Auerbach lectured there, and was murdered by the Gestapo during the Holocaust in Poland.

Auerbach was an associate member of the Scientific Society of Lwów, as well as the contributor of the Polish Academy of Sciences Philological Commission. He published the first complete Polish university textbook on the Greek grammar in 1935, which was repeatedly reprinted.

Marian Auerbach should not be confused with Herman Auerbach (1901–1942), a prominent mathematician and professor at the Department of Mathematics at the Lwów University murdered in 1942 at the Lwów Ghetto.

== Bibliography ==
- "Skład Uniwersytetu Jana Kazimierza we Lwowie w roku 1935" (The composition of the Jan Kazimierz University in Lvov in 1935) at www.lwow.home.pl. Retrieved 21 March 2012. (in Polish)
- Jan Draus, Uniwersytet Jana Kazimierza we Lwowie 1918-1946 (Jan Kazimierz University in Lvov 1918-1946)
- Lviv University Archives. Wayback Machine.
