= Neil Auerbach =

American private equity investor

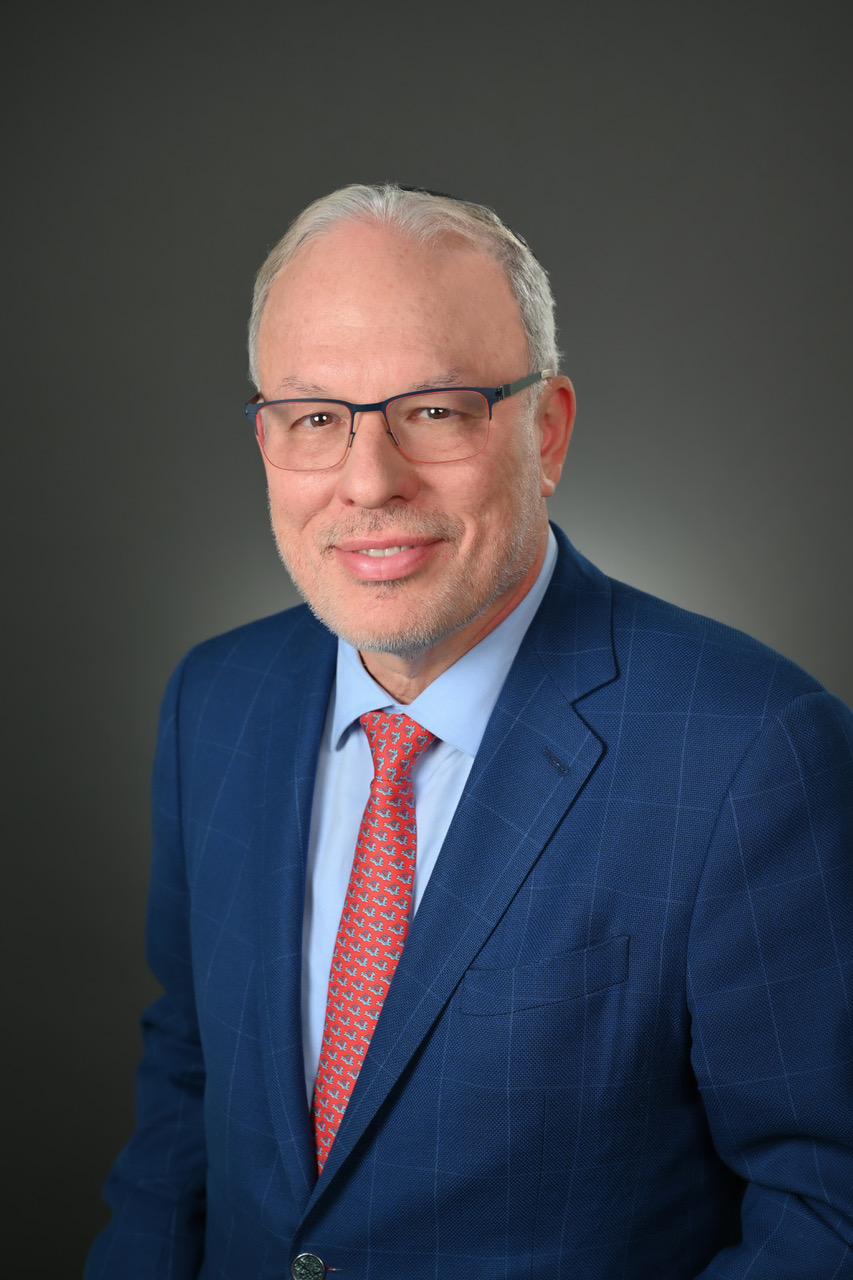
Neil Z. Auerbach, founder of Hudson Sustainable Group

Neil Z. Auerbach (born December 3, 1958) is a private equity investor and a pioneer in the sustainable investment sector. Over the course of his 20+ years in the sustainability sector, Auerbach has led over 30 investments in 26 countries and is known for his early leadership in the financial services industry’s transition to clean energy investment. Auerbach is the CEO & Chairman of Hudson Sustainable Group, based in Miami, Florida.

== Education and early career ==
Auerbach was born and raised in New York City. He began his education in the New York City public school system and then attended the State University of New York at Albany, where he earned a B.S. He went on to attend Boston University School of Law, where he earned a J.D., and New York University School of Law, where he earned an LL.M. in Taxation.

After working at several law firms in his early career, Auerbach was named Partner at McDermott, Will & Emery (1991-1992) and then served as Branch Chief, Assistant to the Associate Chief Counsel of the Internal Revenue Service (1992-1994). Auerbach launched his banking career at Morgan Stanley (1995-1997) as Principal (Co-Head) of a joint venture between the firm's Derivatives & Debt Capital Markets groups and went on to become managing director and Head of Structured Capital Markets at Barclays Capital (1997-1999).

== Goldman Sachs ==
After working in the Debt Capital Markets and Credit Derivatives units at Goldman Sachs, Auerbach joined Goldman's Special Situations Group in December 2003. He began to focus on the renewable energy industry in the U.S. and went on to launch the alternative energy investment business within the Special Situations Group with a principal focus on wind and solar energy. During Auerbach's tenure in the Group, he invested over $1.5 billion of firm capital in wind energy, solar energy, and biofuel companies and established a track record of developing, closing, and funding unique structured financings. Auerbach led several of Goldman's most successful renewable energy investments, including Horizon Wind Energy, SunEdison, and First Solar.

== Hudson Clean Energy Partners ==
In 2007, Auerbach was joined by two other Goldman colleagues to found Hudson Clean Energy Partners (“HCEP”), an independent private equity firm. Auerbach served as Co-Managing Partner with John Cavalier, who joined Hudson in 2008 from Credit Suisse's Global Energy Group, where he was chairman.

HCEP raised over $1 billion in assets and invested in sectors including wind, solar, and hydroelectric energy, biomass, smart grid, energy efficiency, and storage. HCEP wound down its operations gradually beginning in 2014. John Cavalier departed in 2017.

== Hudson Sustainable Group (HSG) ==
In 2014 Hudson reorganized as Hudson Sustainable Group (“HSG”). Auerbach currently serves as CEO and Chairman. HSG continued to raise infrastructure and private equity funds but also expanded into starting and building companies in the clean energy sector. Its initial foray into company building started with Sunlight Financial.

=== Sunlight Financial ===
In 2014, Neil Auerbach founded Sunlight Financial LLC (“Sunlight”) along with other HSG colleagues. Sunlight quickly grew to become one of the largest solar financiers in the United States, arranging over $10 billion in loans to homeowners since inception. Auerbach was the first CEO and transitioned to the role of Executive Chairman and then Chairman with the hiring of Matt Potere as CEO in September 2015.

On July 12, 2021, Sunlight went public on the NY Stock Exchange in a de-SPAC transaction led by Apollo Management. The company was initially valued at $1.3 billion at the time of its public listing. Upon the public listing Auerbach and Wilson Chang resigned their board roles in favor of independent directors. In 2022, Sunlight reported growth in funded loans of 15%, average solar loan balance growth of 13%, and borrowers served of 12%. Despite this growth Sunlight reported a 16% decrease in revenue and a GAAP net loss of $511.9M (down from $241.0M in the prior year), primarily due to a $445.8M non-cash impairment of goodwill driven by an increase in interest rates. In the 3 months ended in June 2023 Sunlight Financial Holdings Inc. reported a net loss of $54.66M, a steep fall from a profit of $4.12M reported in the prior year. Sunlight continued to struggle financially throughout the rest of 2023.

On October 30, 2023, Sunlight and its affiliates each filed voluntary petitions for chapter 11 U.S. Bankruptcy in Delaware.

==== Sunlight Financial Investor Lawsuit ====
On October 3, 2023, Neil and Hudson Sustainable Group filed a lawsuit against certain officers and directors of Sunlight Financial, seeking over $60m in damages, alleging that Sunlight failed to disclose material information in 2022 and 2023 vital to understanding the precarious financial condition of the company.

==== Sunlight Financial Minnesota Lawsuit ====
On March 8, 2024 the Minnesota Attorney General filed suit against Sunlight Financial and three other lending companies (GoodLeap, Solar Mosaic, and Dividend Solar Finance—a subsidiary of Fifth Third Bank). The lawsuit alleges the lenders violated Minnesota state laws against deceptive trade practices, deceptive lending, and illegally high rates of interest. According to the lawsuit, “Defendants deceive consumers by charging a hidden and costly upfront fee that they add into the stated price of each financed system while falsely telling consumers that the inflated price only reflects the system’s cost rather than financing.”

=== Sustainable BioSolutions ===
In 2018, Hudson acquired Sustainable BioSolutions, a distressed biogas developer in Denmark, which was attempting to develop the largest biogas plant in the world. HSG partnered with a European real estate development firm to acquire the company, and jointly led all aspects of the investment and redevelopment. SBS was acquired by Arjun Infrastructure Partners in 2020.

=== Hudson Japan ===
In 2018, Auerbach and partner Jonathan Lee expanded HSG’s business into the Japanese renewable energy market with the establishment of Hudson Sustainable Japan. During this time, Hudson acquired and developed 33 solar PV facilities distributed through Japan. In 2022, Hudson expanded its team in Japan to focus on opportunities in the corporate PPA renewable power market.

=== Tandem Infrastructure ===
In 2022, Hudson provided seed financing and ongoing support to Tandem Infrastructure (website) to accelerate its mission of building a nationwide sales channel in the commercial and industrial solar industry. Tandem’s business model offers property owners an entirely new stream of income through roof leases.

=== Latin American Real Assets (LARA) Opportunity Fund ===
In 2023, Hudson Sustainable Group joined Mauricio Claver-Carone and Jessica Bedoya in launching the Latin America Real Assets Opportunities (LARA) Fund. LARA is primarily focused on transitional energy and sustainable infrastructure investments across 12 attractive countries in LATAM and the Caribbean. HSG’s involvement in LARA marks a return to the fund management business for HSG and may signal other similar initiatives in the future.

== Policy initiatives ==
As a former Commissioner of the National Commission on Energy Policy (Bipartisan Policy Center), Auerbach has advocated bipartisan support for U.S. clean energy legislation, developed in-depth policy recommendations, and participated in a commission consisting of a private, bipartisan, and diverse group of leading energy experts and stakeholders.

Auerbach was also an early supporter of the tax equity market as a significant driver of the expansion of U.S. renewable energy. He has stated that it has had a positive impact in the areas of utility‐scale wind power generation and commercial‐scale solar facilities.

In 2011, Auerbach testified in front of the U.S. Senate Committee on Energy and Natural Resources, the U.S. House Energy and Commerce Sub-Committee on Energy and Power, and the U.S. House Committee on Ways and Means, proposing a market-based approach for the federal government to encourage large-scale deployment of clean energy in the U.S. Auerbach has supported the development and implementation of reverse auctions as an innovative approach to support the continued growth of the renewable energy sector that has met success in other industries and recently in the renewable energy industry in Brazil, Argentina, Mexico, Peru, Honduras, Uruguay, China, Morocco, and Egypt.

Auerbach has continued to advocate for sustainability focused policies in the U.S., including most recently – in 2023 – with former US National Security Advisor, Robert O’Brien. In the Fox News Op-Ed, titled “It's time for an 'America First' climate agenda. Here are 3 ways Republicans can win in 2024,” Auerbach and O’Brien called for a three-pronged policy agenda focusing on promoting advanced low-carbon energy, domestic mining and manufacturing, and clean U.S. fossil fuel extraction.

== Affiliations ==
Auerbach is a senior advisor to the American Conservation Coalition, a grassroots conservation advocacy group. He has been a member of the American Council on Renewable Energy (ACORE) and served on the executive committee of ACORE's Partnership for Renewable Energy Finance (US PREF). Auerbach has been a member of the U.S. Council on Competitiveness, the Brookings China Center, and was formerly a Commissioner of the National Commission on Energy Policy

== Media appearances ==
Auerbach has appeared in the media providing expert commentary on energy and investment issues. Below is a partial list in chronological order.

- FOX Business “It's time for an 'America First' climate agenda. Here are 3 ways Republicans can win in 2024” (9/12/23)
- CNBC “Op-Ed: Why Rick Perry could actually be good for green energy” (12/28/16)
- The Mercury News “Neil Z. Auerbach: Solar tax credit to stay for corporations but not average Joe” (7/14/15)
- CNBC "Best Opportunities in Clean Energy" (April, 2012)
- Bloomberg Radio "Neil Auerbach on The Hays Advantage with Kathleen Hays and Vonnie Quinn" (March, 2012)
- Asian Venture Capital Journal "Hudson Clean Energy Makes China Debut" (March, 2012)
- Reuters "Analysis: As solar panels eclipsed, installers in limelight" (February, 2012)
- Reuters "PE Hudson eyes biggest China cleantech fund" (September, 2011)
- National Journal "Escaping the Valley of Death" (June, 2011)
- Bloomberg Radio "Neil Auerbach on The Hays Advantage with Kathleen Hays" (May, 2011)
- MarketWatch "Green-energy gurus not holding breath on CO2 rules" (June, 2009)
