= Auerbach (Jewish family) =

Jewish scholarly family

Auerbach family Авербах (אוּרבּך)
- Family
- Etymology: "The stream that comes from the meadow, meadow brook"
- Place of origin: Regensburg, Holy Roman Empire
- Founded: 1497
- Founder: Moses Auerbach
- Titles: Court Jew, nobility under the Habsburg monarchy
- Members: Moses Auerbach; Meshullam Solomon Fischhof-Auerbach; Menahem Mendel Auerbach; Simon Auerbach; Hayyim Auerbach; Benjamin Wolf Auerbach; David Tebele Auerbach; Phineas Auerbach; Hirsch Auerbach; Meir Auerbach

The Jewish family Auerbach, Авербах (אוּרבּך) of the 16th to 19th century was a family of scholars, the progenitor of which was Moses Auerbach, born around 1462, court Jew to the bishop of Regensburg as of around 1497. One of his daughters, who went to Kraków after her marriage, is the reputed ancestress of the celebrated Rabbi Moses Isserles (רמ״א). The Auerbach family gained Court Jew status and later nobility titles under the Habsburg monarchy. The name, Auerbach means, "the stream that comes from the meadow, meadow brook". Auerbach is the name of several places in Southern Germany.

== Viennese Branch ==
Another branch of the Auerbach family settled at Vienna. A near-relative, Meshullam Solomon Fischhof-Auerbach, achieved eminence in that city and married Miriam Lucerna, the daughter of a well-known rabbi and physician, Leo Lucerna (Judah Löb Ma‘or-qat‘on L.). {Miriam is known to have died on July 29, 1654 (Frankl, Inschriften, No. 202)}. In his old age, it was Meshullam's misfortune to be driven from Vienna and exiled (1670) with his coreligionists. Before his death (1677), he had the satisfaction of seeing his sons occupy honorable positions. Nearly twenty years before, his son, Menahem Mendel Auerbach, had been called as rabbi to Raussnitz, Moravia, after having officiated as assessor to the rabbinate at Kraków. The pupil of Yom-Tov Lipmann Heller, Joel Sarkes, and Joshua ben Joseph at the Talmud school in Kraków, Menahem Mendel achieved an international reputation for Talmudic authority.

== Simon Auerbach ==
The best known among Mendel's brothers is Simon Auerbach, who at the age of twenty-three wrote a penitential poem on the occasion of an epidemic that broke out among children in Vienna, in 1634. This poem passed through several editions, under the title Mish'on (sic) la-Yeladim (Support to Children), Frankfort-on-the-Main, 1711. The author died on 11 March 1638 in Eibenschütz (Ivančice). The poem was printed by the grandson of the author, Meshullam Solomon Fischhof, who added a commentary, Rab Shalom (Much Peace). He also published several prayers and hymns of Israel Nagara, with additions of his own (Frankfort-on-the-Main, 1712).

== Hayyim Auerbach ==
Hayyim Auerbach, a second brother of Menahem Mendel, settled at Kraków but later returned to Vienna as assessor of the rabbinate. He died there on 7 October 1665. A third brother, Benjamin Wolf Auerbach, settled at Nikolsburg and was held in high esteem as elder of the community, even officiating temporarily as chairman of the college of the rabbinate. His testament, printed together with the work Meqor Chokmah (Source of Wisdom), which contains an abundance of worldly wisdom and pious reflection, was published by his son, Meshullam Solomon, assessor of the rabbinate at Nikolsburg, who published an ethical work at the same time.

Menahem Mendel's successor as rabbi of Krotoszyn was his grandson, who bore the same name, the son of Moses Auerbach (died May 9, 1739). Menahem Mendel ben Moses Auerbach served as rabbi of the congregation in Krotoszyn from 1732 to 1755, and was president of the Synod of the Four Lands; he died in 1760. He was the son-in-law of Rabbi Saul of Kraków.

A son of Simon Wolf, mentioned above, was David Tebele, surnamed "HaKadosh" (the Holy), who died as chief rabbi of Prague. His name was commemorated by his son, Samuel Auerbach, the author of Chesed Shmuel (Samuel's Charity), published in Amsterdam.

== Phineas Auerbach ==
A member of the same family was Phineas Auerbach, president of the Jewish court at Kraków (1695), and author of Halakah Berurah (Lucid Law), a commentary on Orach Chayim.

== Hirsch Auerbach ==
Hirsch Auerbach belongs to another branch of the family. He was first assessor of the rabbinate at Brody, fleeing thence to Germany with a part of the community to escape exorbitant taxation and the machinations of informers. After wandering from one place to another he settled at Worms, to which he had been called in 1733 to Rabbi Löb Sinzheim's college, and was appointed rabbi in the same community in 1763. He died at Worms May 3, 1778, in the eighty-eighth year of his life, his pious wife Dobresch (daughter of the president Isaac at Brody) dying a few weeks before him. His son, born at Brody, Abiezri Selig Auerbach, was at first rabbi at Edenkoben, then at Buxweiler, where he died in 1767; his wife was the daughter of Isaac Sinzheim, rabbi at Trier and Niederehnheim.

== Meir Auerbach ==
Another member of the family was Meir Auerbach (1815), president of the Jewish court at Koło and author of "Imrei Bina" (Words of Wisdom). He emigrated to Palestine and was the first Ashkenazic chief rabbi of Jerusalem to head the Poland Kolel.

== See also ==
- Auerbach (surname), list of persons named Auerbach
- Ari Emanuel, the owner of William Morris Endeavor (WME), the basis for Ari Gold on Entourage
- Rahm Emanuel, former White House Chief of Staff
- Zeke Emanuel, American National Institutes of Health bioethicist
- ירחון בית יעקב No 100 Page 80
