= Friedrich Auerbach =

German chemist (1870–1925)

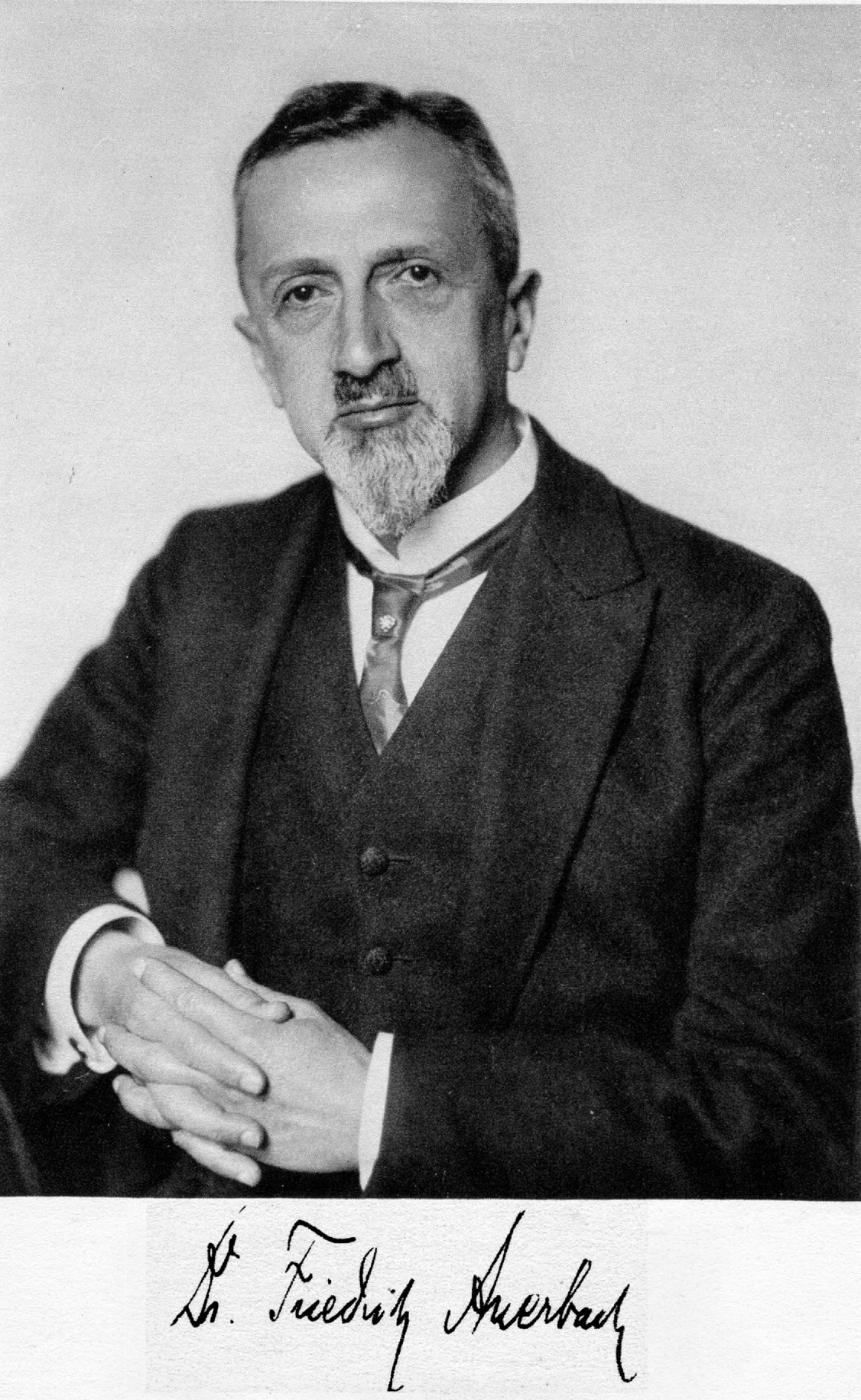
- Friedrich Auerbach, c. 1922
- Born: 23 August 1870; Breslau, Poland
- Died: 4 August 1925 (aged 54); Berlin, Germany
- Occupation: Chemist
- Father: Leopold Auerbach
- Relatives: Felix Auerbach (brother)

Friedrich Auerbach (23 August 1870 – 4 August 1925) was a German chemist.

== Biography ==
Auerbach was born on 23 August 1870, in Breslau, to anatomist Leopold Auerbach. His older brother Felix later became a physicist. He studied mathematics, physics and chemistry at the universities of Leipzig and Breslau — at Leipzig his instructors were Johannes Wislicenus and Wilhelm Ostwald; at Breslau he was a student of Albert Ladenburg. From 1894 to 1903, he was associated with factories in Edenkoben and Krefeld, and afterwards worked in the chemical laboratory of Richard Abegg at Breslau. From 1904, he worked at the Reich Health Office in Berlin, where he eventually attained the position of Oberregierungsrat.

Much of his scientific research dealt with poisons, in particular, issues concerning lead poisoning. With Richard Abegg, he was author of a multi-volume manual on inorganic chemistry, titled "Handbuch der anorganischen Chemie". After Abegg's death on 4 August 1910, he became its sole editor. His daughter Charlotte became a geneticist.

== Published works ==
- Ueber ein neues Collidin und eine Pipecolincarbonsäure, 1893 – About a new collidine and a pipercolic carboxylic acid.
- Handbuch der anorganischen Chemie, 4 volumes 1905-21 (with Ivan Koppel and Richard Abegg) – Handbook of inorganic chemistry.
- Messungen elektromotorischer kräfte galvanischer ketten mit wässerigen elektrolyten, 1911 (with Richard Abegg and Robert Thomas Dietrich Luther) – Measurements of electromotive force galvanic chains with aqueous electrolytes.
- Umsetzungen schwerlöslicher Bleisalze mit wässerigen Lösungen kohlensaurer Alkalien, (with Hans Pick) 1913 – Reactions of slightly soluble lead salts with aqueous solutions of carbonated alkalis.
- Die neuen Wandlungen der Theorie der elektrolytischen Dissoziation, 1922 – On new changes involving the theory of electrolytic dissociation.
