= Leopold Auerbach =

German anatomist and neuropathologist

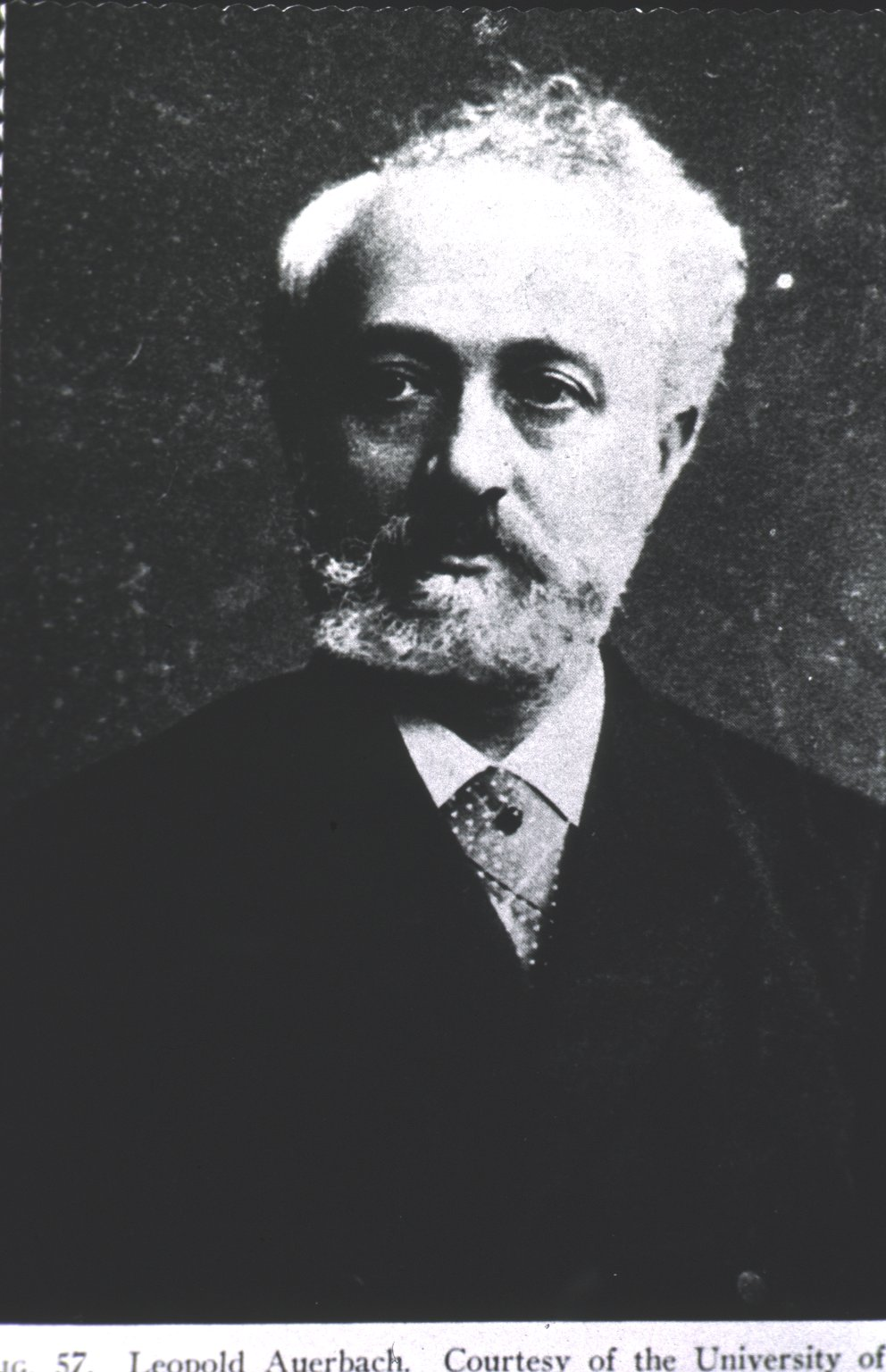
- Born: 27 April 1828
- Died: 30 September 1897 (aged 69)
- Occupations: Anatomist, neuropathologist

Leopold Auerbach (27 April 1828 – 30 September 1897) was a German Jewish anatomist and neuropathologist born in Breslau. He is best known for discovering the myenteric plexus also known as Auerbach's plexus, which helps control the gastrointestinal tract.

== Education and career ==
Auerbach studied medicine at the Universities of Breslau, Berlin and the Leipzig. He became a physician in 1849, obtained his habilitation in 1863. From 1872 he was an associate professor of neuropathology at the University of Breslau.

== Discoveries ==
Auerbach was among the first physicians to diagnose the nervous system using histological staining methods. He published a number of papers on neuropathological problems and muscle-related disorders.

He is credited with the discovery of Plexus myentericus Auerbachi, or Auerbach's plexus, a layer of ganglion cells that provide control of movements of the gastro-intestinal tract, also known as the "myenteric plexus".

"Friedreich–Auerbach disease" is named after Auerbach and pathologist Nikolaus Friedreich (1825–1882). It is a rare disease characterized by hemi-hypertrophy of the facial features, tongue, and tonsils.

== Family ==
Auerbach died in Breslau. His son Felix Auerbach was a renowned physicist, while his son Friedrich Auerbach was a chemist. Friedrich’s daughter Charlotte Auerbach was a geneticist.

== Bibliography ==
- Ueber Percussion der Muskeln; in: Zeitschrift für rationelle Medizin, Leipzig and Heidelberg 1862.
- Bau der Blut- und Lymph-Capillaren; in: Centralblatt für die medicinischen Wissenschaften, Berlin, 1865.
- Lymphgefässe des Darms; in: [Virchows] Archiv für pathologische Anatomie und Physiologie und für klinische Medicin, Berlin, 1865. volume 33.
- Wahre Muskelhypertrophie; in: [Virchows] Archiv für pathologische Anatomie und Physiologie und für klinische Medicin, Berlin, 1871, volume 53.
- Leopold Auerbach (1923). Organologische Studien. Zur Charakteristik und Lebensgeschichte der Zellkerne, Volumes 1–2. Nabu Press. p. 296. ISBN 1294240250.

== See also ==
- German inventors and discoverers

== Sources ==
- "Leopold Auerbach". Who Named It. Archived from the original on June 17, 2002.
