= Charlotte Auerbach =

German geneticist (1899–1994)

Charlotte Auerbach FRS FRSE
- Auerbach c. 1955
- Born: 14 May 1899; Krefeld, Germany
- Died: 17 April 1994 (aged 94); Edinburgh
- Citizenship: Germany, United Kingdom
- Education: University of Würzburg; University of Freiburg; University of Berlin; University of Edinburgh
- Known for: Mutagenesis
- Awards: Keith Medal (1945); Darwin Medal (1976); Mendel Medal (1977)
- Scientific career
- Fields: Genetics
- Workplaces: University of Edinburgh

Charlotte "Lotte" Auerbach FRS FRSE (14 May 1899 – 17 March 1994) was a German geneticist who contributed to founding the science of mutagenesis. She became well known after 1942 when she discovered, with A. J. Clark and J. M. Robson, that mustard gas could cause mutations in fruit flies. She wrote 91 scientific papers, and was a Fellow of the Royal Society of Edinburgh and of the Royal Society of London.

In 1976, she was awarded the Royal Society's Darwin Medal. Aside her scientific contributions and love of science, she was remarkable in many other ways, including her wide interests, independence, modesty, and transparent honesty.

== Early life and education ==
Charlotte Auerbach was born in Krefeld in Germany, the daughter of Selma Sachs and Friedrich Auerbach. She may have been influenced by the scientists in her family: her father Friedrich Auerbach (1870–1925) was a chemist, her uncle a physicist, and her grandfather, the anatomist Leopold Auerbach.

She studied biology and chemistry at the universities of Würzburg, Freiburg and Berlin. She was taught and inspired by Karl Michael Haider and Max Hartmann in Berlin, and later in Würzburg by Hans Kniep. After very good examinations in biology, chemistry, and physics, she initially decided to become a secondary-school teacher of science, passing the exams for that, with distinction in 1924.

She taught in Heidelberg (1924–1925) and briefly at the University of Frankfurt, from which she was dismissed – probably because she was Jewish. In 1928 she started postgraduate research at the Kaiser Wilhelm Institute for Biology (Berlin-Dahlem) in Developmental Physiology under Otto Mangold. In 1929 she abandoned her work with Mangold: he would later join the Nazi party, and Auerbach found his dictatorial manner unpleasant. In reply to her suggestion to change the direction of her project, he replied "You are my student, you do as I say. What you think is of no consequence!"

She again taught biology in several schools in Berlin – until the Nazi party ended this by law as she was Jewish. Following her mother's advice, she left the country in 1933 and fled to Edinburgh where she got her PhD in 1935 at the Institute of Animal Genetics in the University of Edinburgh. She would stay affiliated to this institute throughout her whole career.

== Research career: Edinburgh ==
Auerbach's PhD dissertation was on the development of legs in Drosophila. After her dissertation she became a personal assistant to Francis Albert Eley Crew, who connected her to the lively group of scientists he had assembled, and to invited scientists including Julian Huxley, J.B.S. Haldane, and most importantly to Lotte, to Hermann Joseph Muller. The famous geneticist and mutation researcher stayed in Edinburgh 1938–1940 and introduced her to mutation research.

Initially, she refused to work with Muller when Crew told her to do so. Muller, however, who was present when she opposed her boss, assured her that he would only want to work with people who are interested in the projects. But since she was interested in how genes operate, Muller noted that to understand this it would be important to understand what happens if the genes are mutated – this convinced her. She said herself "His enthusiasm for mutation research was infectious and from that day on I switched to mutation research. I have never regretted it."

Auerbach's genetic mutation research remained unpublished for many years because the work with mustard gas was considered classified by the government. She was finally able to publish in 1947.

After being an assistant instructor in animal genetics, Auerbach became a lecturer in 1947, Professor of Genetics in 1967 and ended her professional career as a Professor Emeritus in 1969.

== Teaching ==
While she found teaching at the schools sometimes difficult, she enjoyed teaching at the university and her lectures were models of clarity, usually delivered without any notes. She spoke with authority, but she did not mind questions, and allowed time for discussions.

She wrote several books to teach genetics, several of them were translated in other languages. Her book, Genetics in the Atomic Age (1956) was praised by The Bulletin of the Atomic Scientists for her excellent explanations of "an inherently technical matter."

== Positions ==
She supported the Campaign for Nuclear Disarmament (CND), was a fierce opponent of apartheid, and a confirmed liberal. In 1947, she published a book of fairy stories titled Adventures with Rosalind under the pen-name of Charlotte Austen.

== Personal life ==
Charlotte was an only child, born into a third-generation Jewish family who had lived for several generations in Breslau. Having fled Nazi Germany in 1933, she became a naturalised British citizen in 1939.

Auerbach never married and had no children of her own. She unofficially 'adopted' two boys. One, Michael Avern, was the child of a German-speaking companion to her own elderly mother, who had escaped to Britain as well. She helped to raise Michael. The other, Angelo Alecci, came from a poor Sicilian family and the Save the Children Fund connected Charlotte with him.

She was Jewish.

== Later life and death ==
In 1989, aged 90, she gave her house in Edinburgh to Michael Avern and moved into the Abbeyfield Home in Polwarth Terrace, Edinburgh, which was operated by the church. She died there five years later, in 1994. She was cremated at Mortonhall Crematorium.

== Awards, honors, and distinctions ==
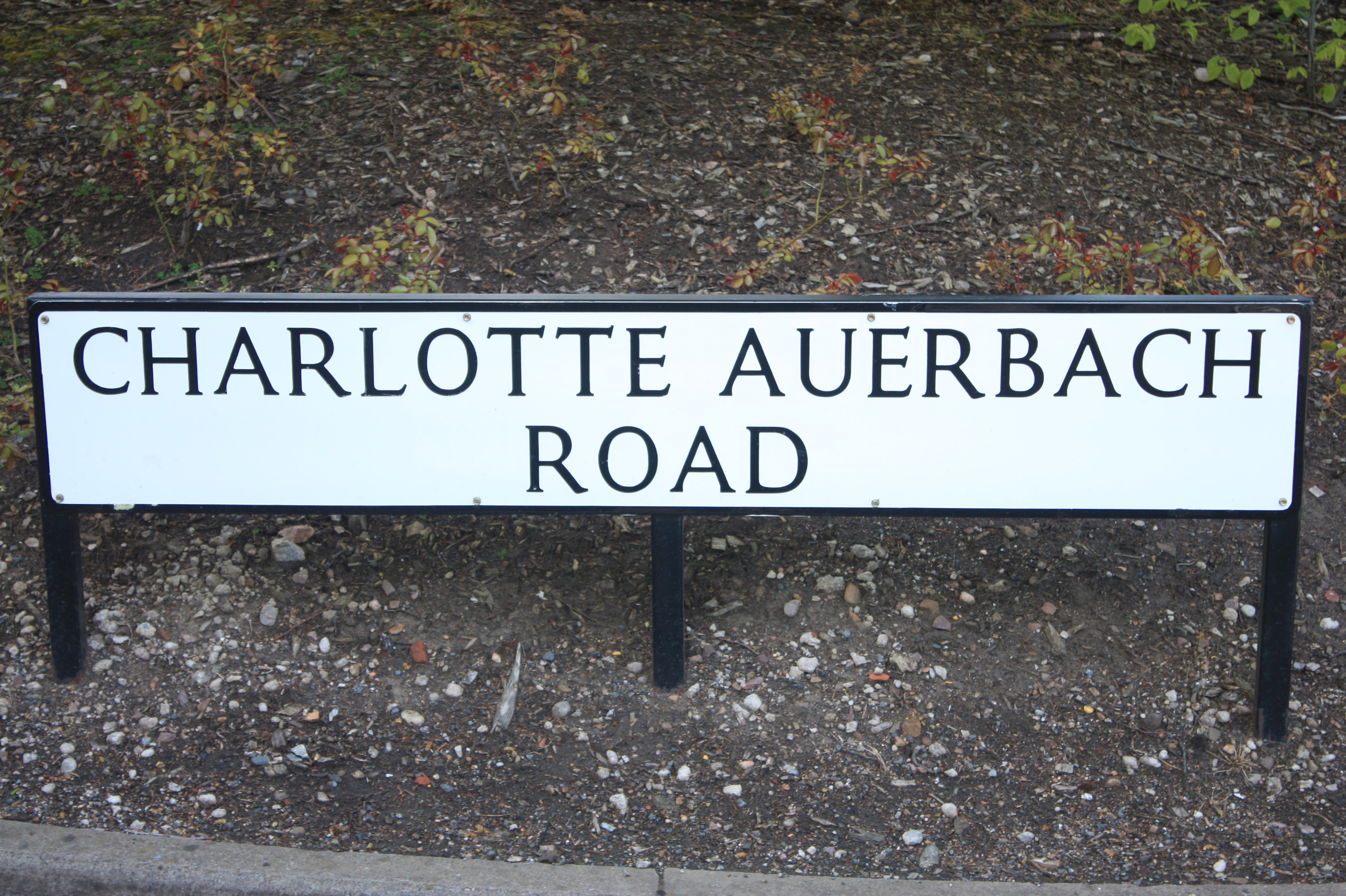
Charlotte Auerbach Road, Edinburgh

- Keith Prize, Royal Society of Edinburgh (1947)
- Fellow of Royal Society of Edinburgh (1949)
- Fellow of the Royal Society (1957)
- Foreign Member, Danish Academy of Science (1968)
- Foreign Member, National Academy of Sciences (1970)
- Honorary degrees, Leiden University (1975), Trinity College, Dublin (1976), University of Cambridge (1976), Indiana University (1984)
- Darwin Medal, Royal Society (1976)
- Fellow, United Kingdom Environmental Mutagen Society (1978)
- Prix de d'Institut de la Vie (Fond, Electricité de France) (1982)
- Gregor Mendel Preis, German Genetical Society (1984)

The greatest reward for herself however was the telegram her hero Hermann Joseph Muller sent after their first striking mutant results in June 1941, which read: "We are thrilled by your major discovery opening great theoretical and practical field. Congratulations."

A room in the Royal Society of Edinburgh's building on George Street, Edinburgh is named for her.

There is a street named Charlotte-Auerbach-Straße in Stuhr-Brinkum. One of the streets in the Kings Buildings university complex in Edinburgh is named Charlotte Auerbach Road in her honour.

== Works ==
=== Books ===
- Auerbach C., 1956. Genetics in the Atomic Age. Oliver and Boyd.
- Auerbach C., 1961, 1964. The Science of Genetics. New Yoerk, Harper & Row.
- Auerbach C., 1965. Notes for Introductory Courses in Genetics. Edinburgh: Kallman.
- Auerbach C., 1976. Mutation Research: Problems, Results and Perspectives. London: Chapman & Hall.

=== Selected publications ===
- Auerbach, C.; Robson, J. M.; Carr, J. G. (1941). "THE EFFECT OF SEX ON THE SPONTANEOUS MUTATION RATE IN DROSOPHILA MELANOGASTER". Genetics. 41 (2–3): 255–265.
- Auerbach, C.; Robson, J. M.; Carr, J. G. (1947). "Chemical Production of Mutations". Science. 105 (2723): 243–247. Bibcode:1947Sci...105..243A. doi:10.1126/science.105.2723.243. PMID 17769478.
- Auerbach, C (1960). "Hazards of Radiation". Nature. 189: 169.
- Auerbach C., 1961. Chemicals and their effects. In: Symposium on Mutation and Plant Breeding, National Research Council Publication 891, 120–144. Washington DC: National Academy of Sciences.
- Auerbach C., 1962. Mutation: An introduction to research on Mutagenesis. Part I. Methods. Edinburgh: Oliver & Boyd.
- Auerbach, C (1962). "The production of visible mutations in Drosophila by clorethylmethanesulfonate". Genetical Research. 3 (3): 461–466. doi:10.1017/s001667230000330x.
- Auerbach, C.; Falconer, D.S.; Isaacson, J.A. (1962). "Test for sex-linked lethals in irradiated mice". Genetical Research. 3 (3): 444–447. doi:10.1017/s0016672300003281.
- Auerbach C., 1963. Stages in the cell cycle and germ cell development. In: Radiation effects in Physics, Chemistry and Biology, edited by Ebert, M. & A. Howard, 152–168. Chicago Year Book Medical.
- Auerbach, C (1966). "Chemical induction of recessive lethals in Neurospora crassa". Microbial Genetics Bulletin. 17: 5.
- Auerbach, C (1966). "Drosophila tests in pharmacology". Nature. 210 (5031): 104. Bibcode:1966Natur.210..104A. doi:10.1038/210104a0. PMID 5956339. S2CID 4178899.
- Auerbach, C (1967). "The chemical production of mutations". Science. 158 (3805): 1141–1147. Bibcode:1967Sci...158.1141A. doi:10.1126/science.158.3805.1141. PMID 6057286. S2CID 11469068.
- Auerbach, C.; Ramsey, D. (1967). "Differential effect of incubation temperature on nitrous acid-induced reversion frequencies at two loci in Neurospora". Mutation Research. 4 (4): 508–510. Bibcode:1967MRFMM...4..508A. doi:10.1016/0027-5107(67)90014-0. PMID 6059028.
- Auerbach, C (1970). "Remark on the 'Tables for determining statistical significance of mutation frequencies'". Mutation Research. 10 (3): 256. doi:10.1016/0027-5107(70)90124-7. PMID 5489973.
- Auerbach, C.; Ramsey, D. (1970). "Analysis of a case of mutagen specificity in Neurospora crassa. II Interaction between treatments with diepoxybutane (DEB) and ultraviolet light". Molecular and General Genetics. 109 (1): 1–17. doi:10.1007/bf00334042. PMID 5488083. S2CID 33628280.
- Auerbach, C (1970). "Analysis of a Case of mutagen specificity in Neurosopra crassa III. Fractionated treatment with diepoxybutane (DEB)". Molecular and General Genetics. 109 (4): 285–291. doi:10.1007/bf00267697. PMID 5497287. S2CID 35695120.
- Auerbach, C.; Kilbey, B.J. (1971). "Mutation in eukaryotes". Annual Review of Genetics. 5: 163–218. doi:10.1146/annurev.ge.05.120171.001115. PMID 16097655.
- Auerbach, C.; Ramsay, D. (1971). "The problem of viability estimates in tests for reverse mutations". Mutation Research. 11 (4): 353–360. PMID 5111491.
- Auerbach, C (1973). "Analysis of the storage effect of diepoxybutane (DEB)". Mutation Research. 18 (2): 129–141. doi:10.1016/0027-5107(73)90029-8.
- Auerbach, C.; Moutschen-Dahmen, M.; Moutschen, J. (1977). "Genetic and cytogenetic effects of formaldehyde and related compounds". Mutation Research. 39 (3–4): 317–362. doi:10.1016/0165-1110(77)90011-2. PMID 331091.
- Auerbach, C (1978). "A pilgrim's progress through mutation research". Perspectives in Biology and Medicine. 21 (3): 319–334. doi:10.1353/pbm.1978.0000. PMID 351542. S2CID 37737550.
