= Haim Nathan Dembitzer =

Polish rabbi and historian

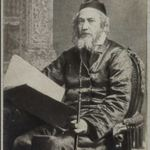
Haim Nathan Dembitzer

Haim Nathan Dembitzer (29 June 1820 – 20 November 1892) was a Polish Galician rabbi and historian.

== Biography ==
Dembitzer was born on 29 June 1820 in Kraków. His father, Jekuthiel Solomon, a scholarly merchant who claimed he was a descendant of R. Moses Isserles, died in 1833, aged forty-four. On 11 June 1841 Haim Nathan Dembitzer married Doba Deutscher. While diligently occupied with his Talmudical studies, he came across the "Tzemach Dawid," a chronological work by David Gans, which aroused his interest in Jewish biography and history. He received his ordination as rabbi from Solomon Kluger, Zvi Hirsch Chajes, and Dob Berush Meisels, the last named of whom was rabbi of Kraków until 1854. Dembitzer sided nevertheless with Meisel's rival, Saul Landau, in the quarrel about the rabbinate of Kraków. In 1856 Dembitzer became a dayyan in his native city, and was, like his older brother Jacob, advanced to the position of rosh Beth din, which he held till his death. In 1874 he visited Germany and made the acquaintance of Leopold Zunz and other Jewish scholars, with whom he corresponded on historical subjects.

Dembitzer died on 20 November 1892 in Kraków.

== Works ==
Dembitzer's earlier works were all on halakic subjects, on which he was a recognized authority. His "Maginne Eretz Yisrael" (responsa, Lemberg, 1852); "Dibre Hen," which appeared as a supplement to Solomon Kluger's "Abodat ha-Kodesh" (Zolkiev, 1863); and "Liwyat Hen" (Kraków, 1882) belong to that class. But the last-named, a critical commentary on the work "RABYH" of Eliezer ben Joel HaLevi, which Dembitzer published from a manuscript, contains much valuable material for the history of the Tosafists, which is interspersed among the pilpulistic arguments of the main subject. His chief historical work, "Kelilat Yofi," of which the first part, containing biographies of the rabbis of Lemberg and of other Polish communities, appeared in 1888, and the second part, also biographical and historical, in 1893 (Kraków), is an important contribution to the science of Judaism. He is also the author of "Michtave Bikoret," a valuable correspondence with the historian Heinrich Graetz about the Council of Four Lands ("Otzar ha-Sifrut," iv. 193-243; also published separately, Kraków, 1892), and of a biography of the Tosafist Joseph Porat, which appeared posthumously in "Ha-Hoker," ii. 48-59. The "Mappelet Ir ha-Tzedek" (1878), a severe and vindictive criticism of J. M. Zunz's "Ir ha-Tzedek" on the rabbis of Kraków, was likewise written by him, although the name of Joel Dembitzer, his younger brother, appears on the title-page as the nominal author.

== Jewish Encyclopedia bibliography ==
- Wettstein, Toledot Maharhan, (German title, Biographie des H. N. Dembitzer), Kraków, 1893;
- Brann, in Monatsschrift, xxxix. 142-143;
- Sefer Zikkaron, p. 2, Warsaw, 1890;
- Ahiasaf for 5654, p. 296.
