= Raman spectroscopy =

Spectroscopic technique

Energy-level diagram showing the states involved in Raman spectra

Raman spectroscopy (/ˈrɑːmən/; named after the physicist C. V. Raman) is a spectroscopic technique typically used to determine vibrational modes of molecules, although rotational and other low-frequency modes of systems may also be observed. Raman spectroscopy is commonly used in chemistry to provide a structural fingerprint by which molecules can be identified.

Raman spectroscopy relies upon inelastic scattering of photons, known as Raman scattering. A source of monochromatic light, usually from a laser in the visible, near infrared, or near ultraviolet range is used, although X-rays can also be used. The laser light interacts with molecular vibrations, phonons or other excitations in the system, resulting in the energy of the laser photons being shifted up or down. The shift in energy gives information about the vibrational modes in the system. Time-resolved spectroscopy and infrared spectroscopy typically yield similar yet complementary information.

Typically, a sample is illuminated with a laser beam. Electromagnetic radiation scattered from the illuminated spot is collected with a lens. Raman scattering is typically very weak. As a result, for many years the main difficulty in collecting Raman spectra was separating the weak inelastically scattered light from the intense Rayleigh scattered laser light (referred to as "laser rejection"). Elastic scattered radiation at the wavelength corresponding to the laser line (Rayleigh scattering) is filtered out by either a notch filter, edge pass filter, or a band pass filter, while the rest of the collected light is dispersed onto a detector.

Spontaneous Raman scattering is typically very weak. Historically, Raman spectrometers used holographic gratings and multiple dispersion stages to achieve a high degree of laser rejection. In the past, photomultipliers were the detectors of choice for dispersive Raman setups, which resulted in long acquisition times. However, modern instrumentation almost universally employs notch or edge filters for laser rejection. Dispersive single-stage spectrographs (axial transmissive (AT) or Czerny–Turner (CT) monochromators) paired with CCD detectors are most common although Fourier transform (FT) spectrometers are also common for use with NIR lasers.

The name "Raman spectroscopy" typically refers to vibrational Raman spectroscopy using laser wavelengths which are not absorbed by the sample. There are many variations of Raman spectroscopy including surface-enhanced Raman, resonance Raman, tip-enhanced Raman, polarized Raman, stimulated Raman, transmission Raman, spatially-offset Raman, and hyper Raman. Raman scattering is not limited to molecular vibration, and it can be applied to rotational, rovibronic, and electronic spectroscopy.

== History ==
Although the inelastic scattering of light was predicted by Adolf Smekal in 1923, it was not observed in practice until 1928. The Raman effect was named after one of its discoverers, the Indian scientist C. V. Raman, who observed the effect in organic liquids in 1928 together with K. S. Krishnan, and independently by Grigory Landsberg and Leonid Mandelstam in inorganic crystals. Raman won the Nobel Prize in Physics in 1930 for this discovery. The first observation of Raman spectra in gases was in 1929 by Franco Rasetti.

Systematic pioneering theory of the Raman effect was developed by Czechoslovak physicist George Placzek between 1930 and 1934. The mercury arc became the principal light source, first with photographic detection and then with spectrophotometric detection.

In the years following its discovery, Raman spectroscopy was used to provide the first catalog of molecular vibrational frequencies. Typically, the sample was held in a long tube and illuminated along its length with a beam of filtered monochromatic light generated by a gas discharge lamp. The photons that were scattered by the sample were collected through an optical flat at the end of the tube. To maximize the sensitivity, the sample was highly concentrated (1 M or more) and relatively large volumes (5 mL or more) were used.

== Raman shift ==
Raman spectra are analyzed relative to the energy of the excitation source. Raman scattered photons are shifted to a different energy, and therefore a different frequency. If the final state is higher in energy than the initial state, the scattered photon will be shifted to a lower frequency (lower energy) so that the total energy remains the same. This shift in frequency is called a Stokes shift, or downshift. If the final state is lower in energy, the scattered photon will be shifted to a higher frequency, which is called an anti-Stokes shift, or upshift.

Raman shifts are typically reported in wavenumbers, which have units of inverse length, as this value is directly related to energy. In order to convert between spectral wavelength and wavenumbers of shift in the Raman spectrum, the following formula can be used:

$$\Delta \tilde{\nu} = \left( \frac{1}{\lambda_0} - \frac{1}{\lambda_1} \right) \ ,$$

where Δν̃ is the Raman shift expressed in wavenumber, λ_{0} is the excitation wavelength, and λ_{1} is the Raman spectrum wavelength. Most commonly, the unit chosen for expressing wavenumber in Raman spectra is inverse centimeters (cm^{−1}). Since wavelength is often expressed in units of nanometers (nm), the formula above can scale for this unit conversion explicitly, giving

$$\Delta \tilde{\nu } (\text{cm}^{-1}) = \left( \frac{1}{\lambda_0 (\text{nm})} - \frac{1}{\lambda_1 (\text{nm})} \right) \times \frac{(10^{7}\text{nm})}{(\text{cm})}.$$

== Instrumentation ==
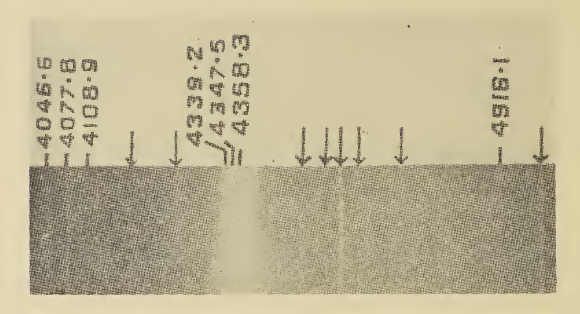
An early Raman spectrum of benzene published by Raman and Krishnan

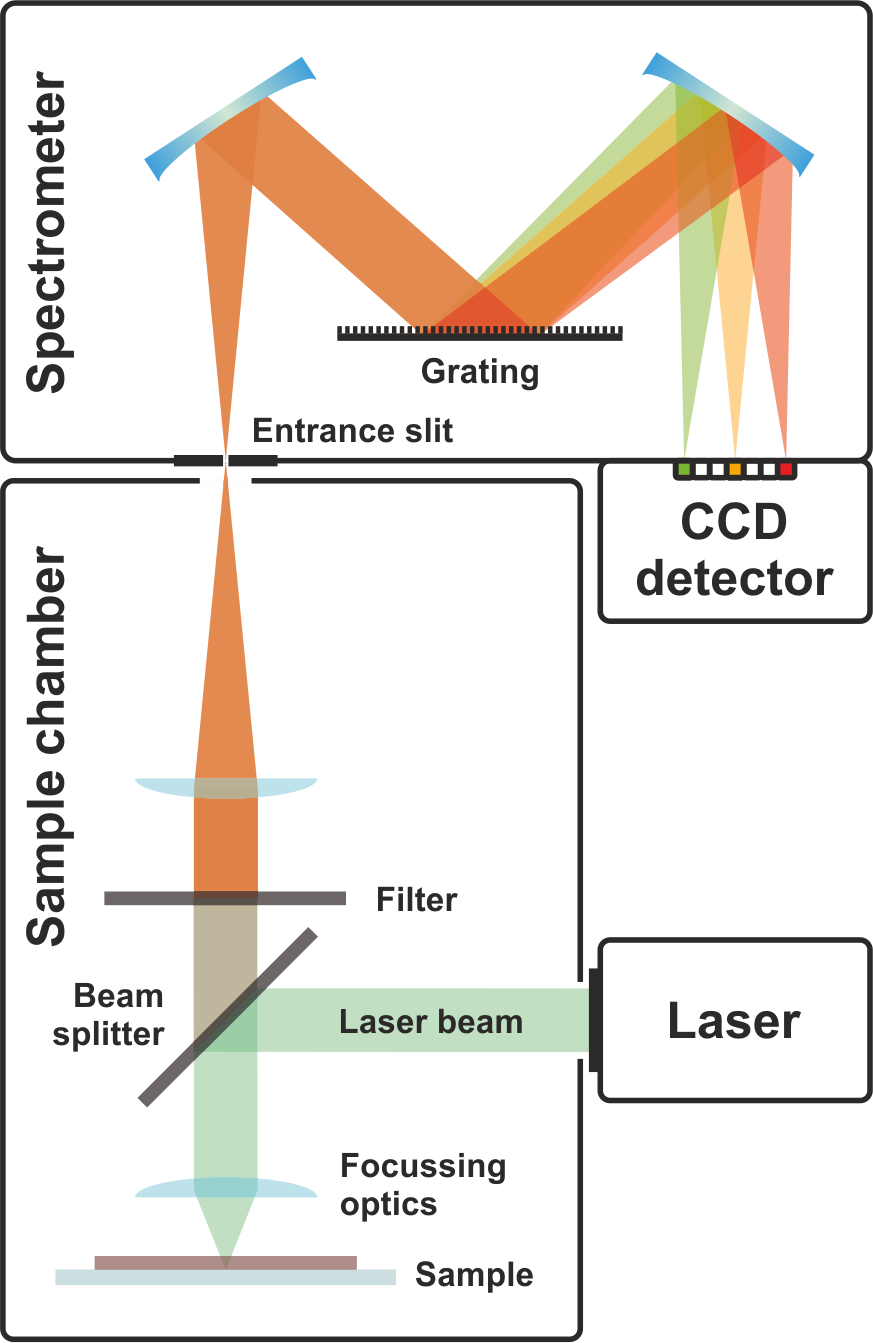
Schematic of one possible dispersive Raman spectroscopy setup

Modern Raman spectroscopy nearly always involves the use of lasers as excitation light sources. Because lasers were not available until more than three decades after the discovery of the effect, Raman and Krishnan used a mercury lamp and photographic plates to record spectra. Early spectra took hours or even days to acquire due to weak light sources, poor sensitivity of the detectors and the weak Raman scattering cross-sections of most materials. Various colored filters and chemical solutions were used to select certain wavelength regions for excitation and detection but the photographic spectra were still dominated by a broad center line corresponding to Rayleigh scattering of the excitation source.

Historically, Raman spectrometers used holographic gratings and multiple dispersion stages to achieve a high degree of laser rejection. However, modern instrumentation almost universally employs notch or edge filters for laser rejection.

In the past, photomultipliers were the detectors of choice for dispersive Raman setups, which resulted in long acquisition times. Technological advances have made Raman spectroscopy much more sensitive, particularly since the 1980s. The most common modern detectors are now CCDs. Photodiode arrays and photomultiplier tubes were common prior to the adoption of CCDs. The advent of reliable, stable, inexpensive lasers with narrow bandwidths has also had an impact.

To disperse the spectral content, dispersive single-stage spectrographs (axial transmissive (AT) or Czerny–Turner (CT) monochromators) paired with a CCD are most common although Fourier transform (FT) spectrometers are also common for use with NIR lasers.

=== Lasers ===
Raman spectroscopy requires a light source such as a laser. The resolution of the spectrum relies on the bandwidth of the laser source used. Generally shorter wavelength lasers give stronger Raman scattering due to the ν^{4} increase in Raman scattering cross-sections, but issues with sample degradation or fluorescence may result.

Continuous wave lasers are most common for normal Raman spectroscopy, but pulsed lasers may also be used. These often have wider bandwidths than their CW counterparts but are very useful for other forms of Raman spectroscopy such as transient, time-resolved and resonance Raman.

=== Detectors ===
Raman scattered light is typically collected and either dispersed by a spectrograph or used with an interferometer for detection by Fourier Transform (FT) methods. In many cases commercially available FT-IR spectrometers can be modified to become FT-Raman spectrometers.

==== Detectors for dispersive Raman ====
In most cases, modern Raman spectrometers use array detectors such as CCDs. Various types of CCDs exist which are optimized for different wavelength ranges. Intensified CCDs can be used for very weak signals and/or pulsed lasers. The spectral range depends on the size of the CCD and the focal length of spectrograph used.

It was once common to use monochromators coupled to photomultiplier tubes. In this case the monochromator would need to be moved in order to scan through a spectral range.

==== Detectors for FT–Raman ====
FT–Raman is almost always used with NIR lasers and appropriate detectors must be used depending on the exciting wavelength. Germanium or Indium gallium arsenide (InGaAs) detectors are commonly used.

=== Filters ===
It is usually necessary to separate the Raman scattered light from the Rayleigh signal and reflected laser signal in order to collect high quality Raman spectra using a laser rejection filter. Notch or long-pass optical filters are typically used for this purpose. Before the advent of holographic filters it was common to use a triple-grating monochromator in subtractive mode to isolate the desired signal. This may still be used to record very small Raman shifts as holographic filters typically reflect some of the low frequency bands in addition to the unshifted laser light. However, Volume hologram filters are becoming more common which allow shifts as low as 5 cm^{−1} to be observed.

== Applications ==
Raman spectroscopy is used in chemistry to identify molecules, quantify their concentration, and understand their physical structure. Vibrational frequencies are specific to a molecule's chemical bonds and symmetry. Infrared and Raman spectra both capture data from the "fingerprint" region of organic molecules (wavenumber range 500–1,500 cm^{−1}). The Raman response is not limited to organic molecules. The intensity of spontaneous Raman scattering is linearly proportional to the concentration of a chemical analyte, enabling quantitative chemical analysis, but linear Raman spectroscopy has a relatively weak response and other methods have been employed to improve the sensitivity. The Raman shift frequencies and the shapes of Raman spectral features relate to the atomic and electronic structure of a molecule, as discussed in the Theory section.

In solid-state physics, Raman spectroscopy is used to characterize materials, measure temperature, and find the crystallographic orientation of a sample. As with single molecules, a solid material can be identified by characteristic phonon modes. Information on the population of a phonon mode is given by the ratio of the Stokes and anti-Stokes intensity of the spontaneous Raman signal. Raman spectroscopy can also be used to observe other low frequency excitations of a solid, such as plasmons, magnons, and superconducting gap excitations. Distributed temperature sensing (DTS) uses the Raman-shifted backscatter from laser pulses to determine the temperature along optical fibers. The orientation of an anisotropic crystal can be found from the polarization of Raman-scattered light with respect to the crystal and the polarization of the laser light, if the crystal structure's point group is known.

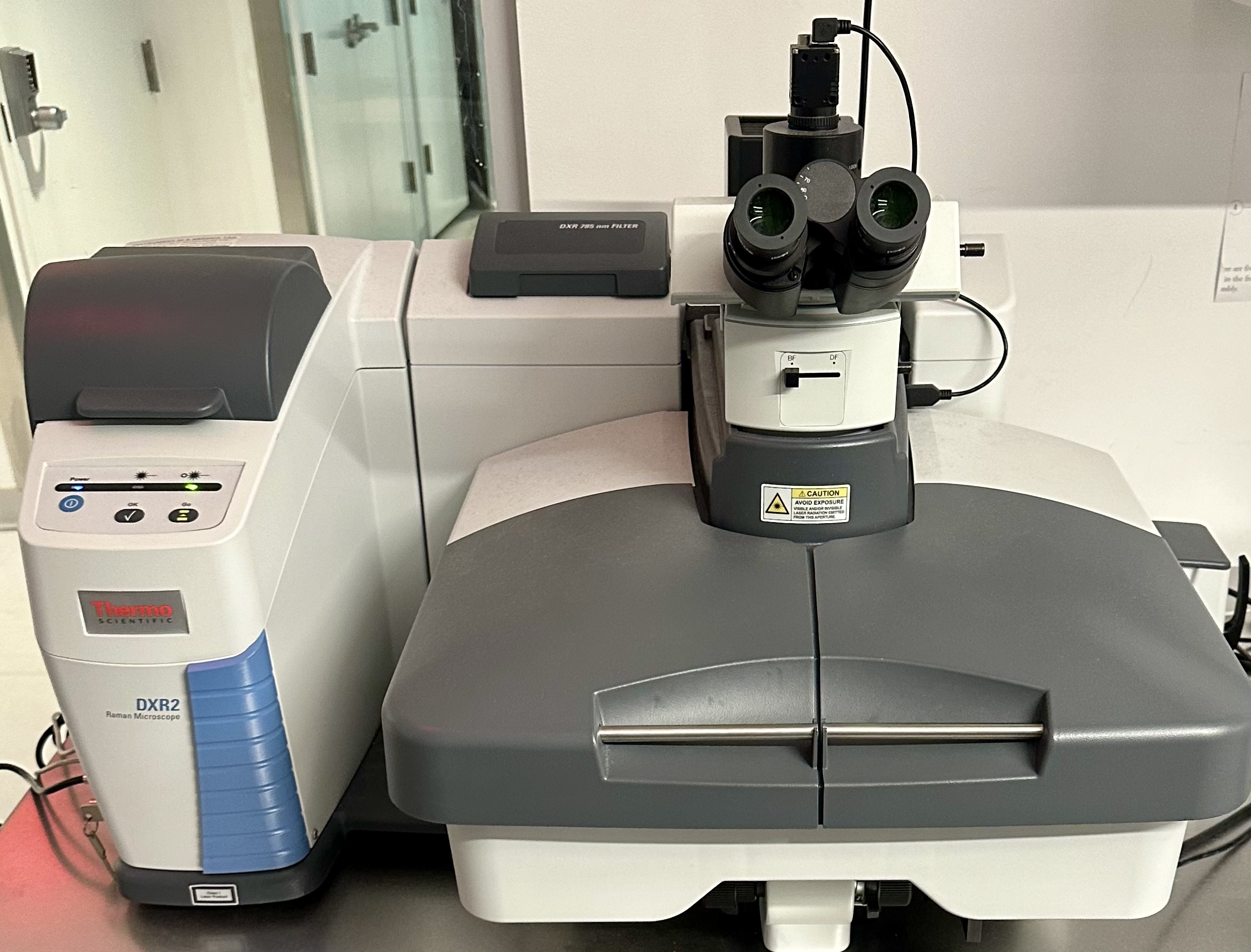
Raman microscope at the Chemistry Department Shared Instrumentation Facility (NYU)

In nanotechnology, a Raman microscope can be used to analyze nanowires to better understand their structures, and the radial breathing mode of carbon nanotubes is commonly used to evaluate their diameter.

Raman active fibers, such as aramid and carbon, have vibrational modes that show a shift in Raman frequency with applied stress. Polypropylene fibers exhibit similar shifts.

In solid state chemistry and the bio-pharmaceutical industry, Raman spectroscopy can be used to not only identify active pharmaceutical ingredients (APIs), but to identify their polymorphic forms, if more than one exist. For example, the drug Cayston (aztreonam), marketed by Gilead Sciences for cystic fibrosis, can be identified and characterized by IR and Raman spectroscopy. Using the correct polymorphic form in bio-pharmaceutical formulations is critical, since different forms have different physical properties, like solubility and melting point.

Raman spectroscopy has a wide variety of applications in biology and medicine. It has helped confirm the existence of low-frequency phonons in proteins and DNA, promoting studies of low-frequency collective motion in proteins and DNA and their biological functions. Raman spectroscopy has also been used for label-free characterization of plasma-derived extracellular vesicle and lipoprotein subpopulations, including comparison of their molecular and lipid profiles. Raman reporter molecules with olefin or alkyne moieties are being developed for tissue imaging with SERS-labeled antibodies. Raman spectroscopy has also been used as a noninvasive technique for real-time, in situ biochemical characterization of wounds. Multivariate analysis of Raman spectra has enabled development of a quantitative measure for wound healing progress. Spatially offset Raman spectroscopy (SORS), which is less sensitive to surface layers than conventional Raman, can be used to discover counterfeit drugs without opening their packaging, and to non-invasively study biological tissue. A reason why Raman spectroscopy is useful in biological applications is because its results often do not face interference from water molecules, due to the fact that they have permanent dipole moments, and as a result, the Raman scattering cannot be picked up on. This is a large advantage, specifically in biological applications. Raman spectroscopy also has a wide usage for studying biominerals. Lastly, Raman gas analyzers have many practical applications, including real-time monitoring of anesthetic and respiratory gas mixtures during surgery.

Raman spectroscopy has been used in several research projects as a means to detect explosives from a safe distance using laser beams.

Raman spectroscopy is being further developed so it could be used in the clinical setting. Raman4Clinic is a European organization that is working on incorporating Raman Spectroscopy techniques in the medical field. They are currently working on different projects, one of them being monitoring cancer using bodily fluids such as urine and blood samples which are easily accessible. This technique would be less stressful on the patients than constantly having to take biopsies which are not always risk free.

In photovoltaics, Raman spectroscopy has gained more interest in the past few years demonstrating high efficacy in delivering important properties for such materials. This includes optoelectronic and physicochemical properties such as open circuit voltage, efficiency, and crystalline structure. This has been demonstrated with several photovoltaic technologies, including kesterite-based, CIGS devices, Monocrystalline silicon cells, and perovskites devices.

=== Art and cultural heritage ===
Raman spectroscopy is an efficient and non-destructive way to investigate works of art and cultural heritage artifacts, in part because it is a non-invasive process which can be applied in situ. It can be used to analyze the corrosion products on the surfaces of artifacts (statues, pottery, etc.), which can lend insight into the corrosive environments experienced by the artifacts. The resulting spectra can also be compared to the spectra of surfaces that are cleaned or intentionally corroded, which can aid in determining the authenticity of valuable historical artifacts.

It is capable of identifying individual pigments in paintings and their degradation products, which can provide insight into the working method of an artist in addition to aiding in authentication of paintings. It also gives information about the original state of the painting in cases where the pigments have degraded with age. Beyond the identification of pigments, extensive Raman microspectroscopic imaging has been shown to provide access to a plethora of trace compounds in Early Medieval Egyptian blue, which enable to reconstruct the individual "biography" of a colourant, including information on the type and provenance of the raw materials, synthesis and application of the pigment, and the ageing of the paint layer.

In addition to paintings and artifacts, Raman spectroscopy can be used to investigate the chemical composition of historical documents (such as the Book of Kells), which can provide insight about the social and economic conditions when they were created. It also offers a noninvasive way to determine the best method of preservation or conservation of such cultural heritage artifacts, by providing insight into the causes behind deterioration.

The IRUG (Infrared and Raman Users Group) Spectral Database is a rigorously peer-reviewed online database of IR and Raman reference spectra for cultural heritage materials such as works of art, architecture, and archaeological artifacts. The database is open for the general public to peruse, and includes interactive spectra for over a hundred different types of pigments and paints.

== Microspectroscopy ==
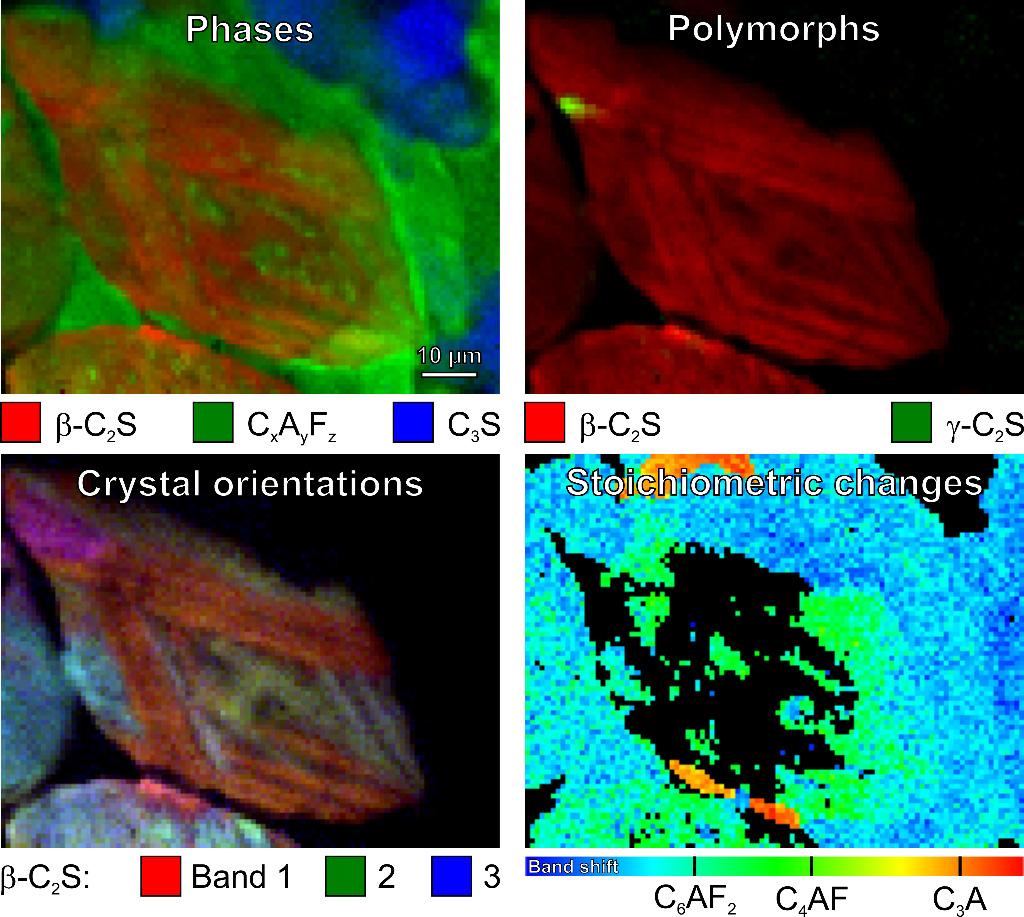
Hyperspectral Raman imaging can provide distribution maps of chemical compounds and material properties: example of an unhydrated clinker remnant in a 19th-century cement mortar (cement chemist's nomenclature: C ≙ CaO, A ≙ Al_{2}O_{3}, S ≙ SiO_{2}, F ≙ Fe_{2}O_{3}).

Raman spectroscopy offers several advantages for microscopic analysis. Since it is a light scattering technique, specimens do not need to be fixed or sectioned. Raman spectra can be collected from a very small volume (< 1 μm in diameter, < 10 μm in depth); these spectra allow the identification of species present in that volume. Water does not generally interfere with Raman spectral analysis. Thus, Raman spectroscopy is suitable for the microscopic examination of minerals, materials such as polymers and ceramics, cells, proteins and forensic trace evidence. A Raman microscope begins with a standard optical microscope, and adds an excitation laser, a monochromator or polychromator, and a sensitive detector (such as a charge-coupled device (CCD), or photomultiplier tube (PMT)). FT-Raman has also been used with microscopes, typically in combination with near-infrared (NIR) laser excitation. Ultraviolet microscopes and UV enhanced optics must be used when a UV laser source is used for Raman microspectroscopy.

In direct imaging (also termed global imaging or wide-field illumination), the whole field of view is examined for light scattering integrated over a small range of wavenumbers (Raman shifts). For instance, a wavenumber characteristic for cholesterol could be used to record the distribution of cholesterol within a cell culture. This technique is being used for the characterization of large-scale devices, mapping of different compounds and dynamics study. It has already been used for the characterization of graphene layers, J-aggregated dyes inside carbon nanotubes and multiple other 2D materials such as MoS_{2} and WSe_{2}. Since the excitation beam is dispersed over the whole field of view, those measurements can be done without damaging the sample.

The most common approach is hyperspectral imaging or chemical imaging, in which thousands of Raman spectra are acquired from all over the field of view by, for example, raster scanning of a focused laser beam through a sample. The data can be used to generate images showing the location and amount of different components. Having the full spectroscopic information available in every measurement spot has the advantage that several components can be mapped at the same time, including chemically similar and even polymorphic forms, which cannot be distinguished by detecting only one single wavenumber. Furthermore, material properties such as stress and strain, crystal orientation, crystallinity and incorporation of foreign ions into crystal lattices (e.g., doping, solid solution series) can be determined from hyperspectral maps. Taking the cell culture example, a hyperspectral image could show the distribution of cholesterol, as well as proteins, nucleic acids, and fatty acids. Sophisticated signal- and image-processing techniques can be used to ignore the presence of water, culture media, buffers, and other interferences.

Because a Raman microscope is a diffraction-limited system, its spatial resolution depends on the wavelength of light, the numerical aperture of the focusing element, and — in the case of confocal microscopy — on the diameter of the confocal aperture. When operated in the visible to near-infrared range, a Raman microscope can achieve lateral resolutions of approx. 1 μm down to 250 nm, depending on the wavelength and type of objective lens (e.g., air vs. water or oil immersion lenses). The depth resolution (if not limited by the optical penetration depth of the sample) can range from 1–6 μm with the smallest confocal pinhole aperture to tens of micrometers when operated without a confocal pinhole. Depending on the sample, the high laser power density due to microscopic focussing can have the benefit of enhanced photobleaching of molecules emitting interfering fluorescence. However, the laser wavelength and laser power have to be carefully selected for each type of sample to avoid its degradation.

Applications of Raman imaging range from materials sciences to biological studies. For each type of sample, the measurement parameters have to be individually optimized. For that reason, modern Raman microscopes are often equipped with several lasers offering different wavelengths, a set of objective lenses, and neutral density filters for tuning of the laser power reaching the sample. Selection of the laser wavelength mainly depends on optical properties of the sample and on the aim of the investigation. For example, Raman microscopy of biological and medical specimens is often performed using red to near-infrared excitation (e.g., 785 nm, or 1,064 nm wavelength). Due to typically low absorbances of biological samples in this spectral range, the risk of damaging the specimen as well as autofluorescence emission are reduced, and high penetration depths into tissues can be achieved. However, the intensity of Raman scattering at long wavelengths is low (owing to the ω^{4} dependence of Raman scattering intensity), leading to long acquisition times. On the other hand, resonance Raman imaging of single-cell algae at 532 nm (green) can specifically probe the carotenoid distribution within a cell by a using low laser power of ~5 μW and only 100 ms acquisition time.

Raman scattering, specifically tip-enhanced Raman spectroscopy, produces high resolution hyperspectral images of single molecules, atoms, and DNA.

== Variants ==
At least 25 variations of Raman spectroscopy have been developed. The usual purpose is to enhance the sensitivity (e.g., Surface-enhanced Raman spectroscopy (SERS)), to improve the spatial resolution (Raman microscopy), or to acquire very specific information (resonance Raman).

=== Spontaneous (or far-field) Raman spectroscopy ===
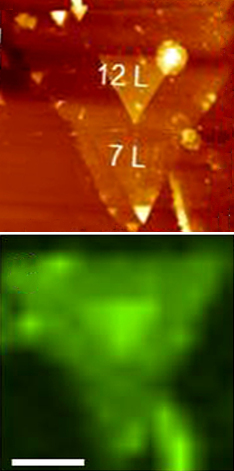
Correlative Raman imaging: comparison of topographical (AFM, top) and Raman images of GaSe. Scale bar is 5 μm.

Terms such as spontaneous Raman spectroscopy or normal Raman spectroscopy summarize Raman spectroscopy techniques based on Raman scattering by using normal far-field optics as described above. Variants of normal Raman spectroscopy exist with respect to excitation-detection geometries, combination with other techniques, use of special (polarizing) optics and specific choice of excitation wavelengths for resonance enhancement.

- Correlative Raman imaging – Raman microscopy can be combined with complementary imaging methods, such as atomic force microscopy (Raman-AFM) and scanning electron microscopy (Raman-SEM) to compare Raman distribution maps with (or overlay them onto) topographical or morphological images, and to correlate Raman spectra with complementary physical or chemical information (e.g., gained by SEM-EDX).
- Resonance Raman spectroscopy – The excitation wavelength is matched to an electronic transition of the molecule or crystal, so that vibrational modes associated with the excited electronic state are greatly enhanced. This is useful for studying large molecules such as polypeptides, which might show hundreds of bands in "conventional" Raman spectra. It is also useful for associating normal modes with their observed frequency shifts.
- Angle-resolved Raman spectroscopy – Not only are standard Raman results recorded but also the angle with respect to the incident laser. If the orientation of the sample is known then detailed information about the phonon dispersion relation can also be gleaned from a single test.
- Optical tweezers Raman spectroscopy (OTRS) – Used to study individual particles, and even biochemical processes in single cells trapped by optical tweezers.
- Spatially offset Raman spectroscopy (SORS) – The Raman scattering beneath an obscuring surface is retrieved from a scaled subtraction of two spectra taken at two spatially offset points.
- Raman optical activity (ROA) – Measures vibrational optical activity by means of a small difference in the intensity of Raman scattering from chiral molecules in right- and left-circularly polarized incident light or, equivalently, a small circularly polarized component in the scattered light.
- Transmission Raman – Allows probing of a significant bulk of a turbid material, such as powders, capsules, living tissue, etc. It was largely ignored following investigations in the late 1960s (Schrader and Bergmann, 1967) but was rediscovered in 2006 as a means of rapid assay of pharmaceutical dosage forms. There are medical diagnostic applications particularly in the detection of cancer.
- Micro-cavity substrates – A method that improves the detection limit of conventional Raman spectra using micro-Raman in a micro-cavity coated with reflective Au or Ag. The micro-cavity has a radius of several micrometers and enhances the entire Raman signal by providing multiple excitations of the sample and couples the forward-scattered Raman photons toward the collection optics in the back-scattered Raman geometry.
- Stand-off remote Raman – In standoff Raman, the sample is measured at a distance from the Raman spectrometer, usually by using a telescope for light collection. Remote Raman spectroscopy was proposed in the 1960s and initially developed for the measurement of atmospheric gases. The technique was extended In 1992 by Angel et al. for standoff Raman detection of hazardous inorganic and organic compounds.
- X-ray Raman scattering – Measures electronic transitions rather than vibrations.

=== Enhanced (or near-field) Raman spectroscopy ===
Enhancement of Raman scattering is achieved by local electric-field enhancement by optical near-field effects (e.g. localized surface plasmons).

- Surface-enhanced Raman spectroscopy (SERS) – Normally done in a silver or gold colloid or a substrate containing silver or gold. Surface plasmons of silver and gold are excited by the laser, resulting in an increase in the electric fields surrounding the metal. Given that Raman intensities are proportional to the electric field, there is large increase in the measured signal (by up to 10^{11}). This effect was originally observed by Martin Fleischmann but the prevailing explanation was proposed by Van Duyne in 1977. A comprehensive theory of the effect was given by Lombardi and Birke.
- Surface-enhanced resonance Raman spectroscopy (SERRS) – A combination of SERS and resonance Raman spectroscopy that uses proximity to a surface to increase Raman intensity, and excitation wavelength matched to the maximum absorbance of the molecule being analysed.
- Tip-enhanced Raman spectroscopy (TERS) – TERS combines the chemical sensitivity of SERS with the high spatial resolution of scanning probe microscopy techniques, enabling chemical imaging of surfaces at the nanometre length-scale with high detection sensitivity. It uses a metallic (usually silver-/gold-coated AFM or STM) tip to enhance the Raman signals of molecules situated in its vicinity. The spatial resolution is approximately the size of the tip apex (20–30 nm). TERS has been shown to have sensitivity down to the single molecule level and holds some promise for bioanalysis applications and DNA sequencing. TERS was used to image the vibrational normal modes of single molecules.
- Surface plasmon polariton enhanced Raman scattering (SPPERS) – This approach exploits apertureless metallic conical tips for near field excitation of molecules. This technique differs from the TERS approach due to its inherent capability of suppressing the background field. In fact, when an appropriate laser source impinges on the base of the cone, a TM0 mode (polaritonic mode) can be locally created, namely far away from the excitation spot (apex of the tip). The mode can propagate along the tip without producing any radiation field up to the tip apex where it interacts with the molecule. In this way, the focal plane is separated from the excitation plane by a distance given by the tip length, and no background plays any role in the Raman excitation of the molecule.

=== Non-linear Raman spectroscopy ===
Raman signal enhancements are achieved through non-linear optical effects, typically realized by mixing two or more wavelengths emitted by spatially and temporally synchronized pulsed lasers.

- Hyper Raman – A non-linear effect in which the vibrational modes interact with the second harmonic of the excitation beam. This requires very high power, but allows the observation of vibrational modes that are normally "silent". It frequently relies on SERS-type enhancement to boost the sensitivity.
- Stimulated Raman spectroscopy (SRS) – A pump-probe technique, where a spatially coincident, two color pulse (with polarization either parallel or perpendicular) transfers the population from ground to a rovibrationally excited state. If the difference in energy corresponds to an allowed Raman transition, scattered light will correspond to loss or gain in the pump beam.
- Inverse Raman spectroscopy – A synonym for stimulated Raman loss spectroscopy.
- Coherent anti-Stokes Raman spectroscopy (CARS) – Two laser beams are used to generate a coherent anti-Stokes frequency beam, which can be enhanced by resonance.

== Theory ==
Raman spectra are the result of Raman scattering, and the theories established to explain and predict Raman scattering are the basis for explaining the spectra. Quantum mechanical methods, computational chemistry and band structure of solids, are used to predict spectra in detail. The dependence of Raman spectra on molecular symmetry and light polarization are important to highlight.

As discussed above, Raman spectra are measured relative to the excitation light source. The material that scatters the light changes its energetic state, and the scattered light contains information on that state change including its energy.

=== Dependence on molecular symmetry ===
The magnitude of the Raman effect depends on the polarizability of the scattering molecule or material. Polarizability quantifies the electric dipole that is induced by the excitation light source. Polarizability is a characteristic of the molecule or material, and predictions of Raman spectra are predicting the polarizability.

Molecular vibrational modes can be categorized as Raman "active" or "inactive" depending on whether they contribute to the Raman spectrum or not. For a vibrational mode to be Raman active, there must be a change between the polarizability of the initial and final states. This creates a fundamental connection between the symmetry of the molecular vibrational modes and the possibility, or impossibility, of observing them in the Raman spectrum. The symmetry of molecular vibration for a particular molecule can be assessed with an accurate molecular model, and molecules that share symmetries also share characteristic patterns in their Raman spectra.

Raman scattering contrasts with infrared (IR) absorption, where the energy of the absorbed photon matches the difference in energy between the initial and final rovibronic states. The dependence of Raman on the polarizability derivative differs from Infrared spectroscopy, which depends on the electric dipole moment derivative. This contrasting feature allows rovibronic transitions that might not be active in IR to be analyzed using Raman spectroscopy, as exemplified by the rule of mutual exclusion in centrosymmetric molecules. Transitions which have large Raman intensities often have weak IR intensities and vice versa. If a bond is strongly polarized, a small change in its length such as that which occurs during a vibration has only a small resultant effect on polarization. Vibrations involving polar bonds (e.g. C-O, N-O, O-H) are therefore, comparatively weak Raman scatterers. Such polarized bonds, however, carry their electrical charges during the vibrational motion, (unless neutralized by symmetry factors), and this results in a larger net dipole moment change during the vibration, producing a strong IR absorption band. Conversely, relatively neutral bonds (e.g. C-C, C-H, C=C) suffer large changes in polarizability during a vibration. However, the dipole moment is not similarly affected such that while vibrations involving predominantly this type of bond are strong Raman scatterers, they are weak in the IR. A third vibrational spectroscopy technique, inelastic incoherent neutron scattering (IINS), can be used to determine the frequencies of vibrations in highly symmetric molecules that may be both IR and Raman inactive. The IINS selection rules, or allowed transitions, differ from those of IR and Raman, so the three techniques are complementary. They all give the same frequency for a given vibrational transition, but the relative intensities provide different information due to the different types of interaction between the molecule and the incoming particles, photons for IR and Raman, and neutrons for IINS.

=== Polarization dependence of Raman scattering ===
Raman scattering is polarization sensitive and can provide detailed information on symmetry of Raman active modes. While conventional Raman spectroscopy identifies chemical composition, polarization effects on Raman spectra can reveal information on the orientation of molecules in single crystals and anisotropic materials, e.g. strained plastic sheets, as well as the symmetry of vibrational modes.

Polarization–dependent Raman spectroscopy uses (plane) polarized laser excitation from a polarizer. The Raman scattered light collected is passed through a second polarizer (called the analyzer) before entering the detector. The analyzer is oriented either parallel or perpendicular to the polarization of the laser. Spectra acquired with the analyzer set at both perpendicular and parallel to the excitation plane can be used to calculate the depolarization ratio. Typically a polarization scrambler is placed between the analyzer and detector also.It is convenient in polarized Raman spectroscopy to describe the propagation and polarization directions using Porto's notation, described by and named after Brazilian physicist Sergio Pereira da Silva Porto.

For isotropic solutions, the Raman scattering from each mode either retains the polarization of the laser or becomes partly or fully depolarized. If the vibrational mode involved in the Raman scattering process is totally symmetric then the polarization of the Raman scattering will be the same as that of the incoming laser beam. In the case that the vibrational mode is not totally symmetric then the polarization will be lost (scrambled) partially or totally, which is referred to as depolarization. Hence polarized Raman spectroscopy can provide detailed information as to the symmetry labels of vibrational modes.

In the solid state, polarized Raman spectroscopy can be useful in the study of oriented samples such as single crystals. The polarizability of a vibrational mode is not equal along and across the bond. Therefore, the intensity of the Raman scattering will be different when the laser's polarization is along and orthogonal to a particular bond axis. This effect can provide information on the orientation of molecules with a single crystal or material. The spectral information arising from this analysis is often used to understand macro-molecular orientation in crystal lattices, liquid crystals or polymer samples.

=== Polarization and molecular symmetry ===
The polarization technique is useful in understanding the connections between molecular symmetry, Raman activity, and peaks in the corresponding Raman spectra. Polarized light in one direction only gives access to some Raman–active modes, but rotating the polarization gives access to other modes. Each mode is separated according to its symmetry.

The symmetry of a vibrational mode is deduced from the depolarization ratio ρ, which is the ratio of the Raman scattering with polarization orthogonal to the incident laser and the Raman scattering with the same polarization as the incident laser: $\rho = \frac{I_r}{I_u}$ Here $I_r$ is the intensity of Raman scattering when the analyzer is rotated 90 degrees with respect to the incident light's polarization axis, and $I_u$ the intensity of Raman scattering when the analyzer is aligned with the polarization of the incident laser. When polarized light interacts with a molecule, it distorts the molecule which induces an equal and opposite effect in the plane-wave, causing it to be rotated by the difference between the orientation of the molecule and the angle of polarization of the light wave. If $\rho \geq \frac{3}{4}$, then the vibrations at that frequency are depolarized; meaning they are not totally symmetric.

=== Raman excitation profile analysis ===
Resonance Raman selection rules can be explained by the Kramers–Heisenberg equation using the Albrecht A and B terms, as demonstrated. The Kramers–Heisenberg expression is conveniently linked to the polarizability of the molecule within its frame of reference:

$$(\alpha_{\rho\sigma})_{if} = \frac{1}{\hbar} \sum_n \left[ \frac{\langle i \vert \mu_\rho \vert n \rangle \langle n \vert \mu_\sigma \vert f \rangle}{\omega_0 + \omega_{nf} + i \Gamma_n} - \frac{\langle i \vert \mu_\sigma \vert n \rangle \langle n \vert \mu_\rho \vert f \rangle}{\omega_0 - \omega_{nf} - i \Gamma_n} \right] \equiv \langle i \vert \hat{\alpha}_{\rho\sigma} \vert f \rangle$$

The polarizability operator connecting the initial and final states expresses the transition polarizability as a matrix element, as a function of the incidence frequency ω_{0}. The directions x, y, and z in the molecular frame are represented by the Cartesian tensor ρ and σ here. Analyzing Raman excitation patterns requires the use of this equation, which is a sum-over-states expression for polarizability. This series of profiles illustrates the connection between a Raman active vibration's excitation frequency and intensity.

This method takes into account sums over Franck-Condon's active vibrational states and provides insight into electronic absorption and emission spectra. Nevertheless, the work highlights a flaw in the sum-over-states method, especially for large molecules like visible chromophores, which are commonly studied in Raman spectroscopy. The difficulty arises from the potentially infinite number of intermediary steps needed. While lowering the sum at higher vibrational states can help tiny molecules get over this issue, larger molecules find it more challenging when there are more terms in the sum, particularly in the condensed phase when individual eigenstates cannot be resolved spectrally.

To overcome this, two substitute techniques that do not require adding eigenstates can be considered. Among these two methods are available: the transform method. and Heller's time-dependent approach. The goal of both approaches is to take into consideration the frequency-dependent Raman cross-section σ_{R}(ω_{0}) of a particular normal mode.

== Simulation of molecular Raman spectroscopy ==
=== Static (harmonic) model ===
In the conventional Placzek framework, the Raman activity $S_p$ of a vibrational normal mode p is determined by the derivatives of the isotropic and anisotropic parts of the polarizability tensor with respect to the normal coordinate $Q_p$:

$S_p = 45\!\left(\frac{\partial \alpha_\mathrm{iso}}{\partial Q_p}\right)^{2} + 7\!\left(\frac{\partial \alpha_\mathrm{aniso}}{\partial Q_p}\right)^{2}$

Where, $\alpha$ is the 3×3 polarizability tensor.

$\alpha_\mathrm{iso} = \frac{1}{3}(\alpha_{xx}+\alpha_{yy}+\alpha_{zz})$ $\alpha_\mathrm{aniso} = \sqrt{\frac{1}{2}\!\left[(\alpha_{xx}-\alpha_{yy})^2 + (\alpha_{yy}-\alpha_{zz})^2 + (\alpha_{zz}-\alpha_{xx})^2 + 6(\alpha_{xy}^2+\alpha_{yz}^2+\alpha_{zx}^2)\right]}$

In the double-harmonic approximations, the potential energy is expanded to the second order near equilibrium (harmonic force fields), while polarizability, is truncated at first order in the normal coordinates.

=== Polarizability, normal coordinate and frequency ===
The static polarizability tensor is calculated as the second derivative of the electronic energy $E(\mathbf{F})$ with respect to the external electric field $\mathbf{F}$:

$\alpha_{ij} \;=\; -\,\left.\frac{\partial^{2} E(\mathbf{F})}{\partial F_i\,\partial F_j}\right|_{\mathbf{F}=0},\qquad i,j\in\{x,y,z\}$

In practice, $\alpha$ can be calculated through analytical methods or by employing the finite difference method for energy under small perturbations in $\mathbf{F}$. The polarizability derivatives used to calculate Raman activities, which could be obtained by the chain rule that relates Cartesian coordinates $\mathbf{R}$ and normal coordinates $Q_p$:

$\frac{\partial \boldsymbol{\alpha}}{\partial Q_p} = \sum_i\frac{\partial\boldsymbol{\alpha}}{\partial R_i}\frac{\partial R_i}{\partial Q_p}.$

The $\partial R_i / \partial Q_p$ is given by the normalized linear transformation between Cartesian coordinate and mass-weighted normal coordinates:

$\frac{\partial R_i}{\partial Q_p} = (\mathbf{M}^{-1/2}\mathbf{L})_{ip},$

Where $M$ is the diagonal matrix of atomic masses and $L$ is the matrix of orthonormal eigenvectors (normal modes). It is given by diagonalizing the mass-weighted Hessian matrix:

$\mathbf{H}^{(\mathrm{mw})} = \mathbf{M}^{-1/2}\,\mathbf{H}\,\mathbf{M}^{-1/2}.$

The Cartesian Hessian elements are second derivatives of the potential energy with respect to atomic Cartesian coordinates:

$H_{ab} \;=\; \left.\frac{\partial^2 E}{\partial R_a\,\partial R_b}\right|_{\mathbf{R}=\mathbf{R}_0},\qquad a,b=1,\dots,3N.$

By diagonalization of the mass-weighted Hessian, we can obtain the eigenvalues $\omega_p^2$ and eigenvectors $\mathbf{L}$; the vibrational wavenumbers $\tilde{\nu}_p = \frac{\omega_p}{2\pi c}$ are Five (or six for nonlinear molecules) near-zero eigenvalues correspond to overall translations and rotations, which need to remove from the modes when we do vibrational analysis. Since the $\partial \boldsymbol{\alpha}/\partial \mathbf{R}$ is known from finite differences or gradient calculation, it will used to calculate $Q_p$ , and further to get the Raman activities.

=== Raman intensity (Placzek–Neugebauer expression) ===
The Raman intensity for the mode $p$ is provided by

$I_p(\tilde\nu) = K\,(\tilde\nu_\mathrm{in}-\tilde\nu_p)^{4}\tilde\nu_p^{-1}\!\left[45\!\left(\frac{\partial \alpha_\mathrm{iso}}{\partial Q_p}\right)^{2} + 7\!\left(\frac{\partial \alpha_\mathrm{aniso}}{\partial Q_p}\right)^{2}\right]\!\frac{1}{1-\exp(-hc\tilde\nu_p/k_\mathrm{B}T)}$

where

- $\tilde\nu_\mathrm{in}$: the wavenumber of incident light (cm$^{-1}$);
- $\tilde\nu_p$: the vibrational wavenumber of mode $p$;
- $K = \frac{2\pi^4}{45\epsilon_0^2 c^4}$ is a physical prefactor;
- $h$: Planck constant; $c$: speed of light; $k_\mathrm{B}$: Boltzmann constant; $T$: absolute temperature;
- Term $(\tilde\nu_\mathrm{in}-\tilde\nu_p)^4$ provides the characteristic frequency dependence from frequency difference;
- Last factor is the thermal population correction distinguishing Stokes and anti-Stokes lines

Since some thermodynamic calculations ignored in the harmonic approximation, DFT-calculated harmonic frequencies are systematically too high.

Hence, a scaling factor $f_\mathrm{scale}$ is applied to vibrational frequencies before comparing simulated spectrum with the experiment:

$\tilde\nu_\mathrm{corr} = f_\mathrm{scale}\,\tilde\nu_\mathrm{calc}$

For example, the B3LYP/TZVP scaling factor is 0.965.

Before to calculating the static spectrum, the structure must be optimized to its lowest energy point using the same or an approximate DFT basis set/functional. The mentioned static (harmonic) method also has been integrated into the Gaussian software as default, using the keyword Opt Freq=Raman to calculate.

=== Dynamic (time correlation) approach ===
The harmonic approximation methods ignore some non-harmonic calculations. As an alternative, ab initio or machine-learned molecular-dynamics trajectories provide dynamic Raman spectrum.

At each time step, the real-time polarizability tensor $\boldsymbol{\alpha}(t)$ is calculated, from the isotropic and anisotropic components we mentioned as $\alpha_\mathrm{iso}(t)$ and $\alpha_\mathrm{aniso}(t)$, there will obtained from dynamical trajectory.

The time autocorrelation functions as follow:

$C_\mathrm{iso}(t) = \langle \alpha_\mathrm{iso}(0)\,\alpha_\mathrm{iso}(t) \rangle, \qquad C_\mathrm{aniso}(t) = \langle \alpha_\mathrm{aniso}(0)\,\alpha_\mathrm{aniso}(t) \rangle$

and during the Fourier transforms, the isotropic and anisotropic Raman spectra generated as:

$I_\mathrm{iso}(\omega) \propto \int e^{i\omega t}\,C_\mathrm{iso}(t)\,dt,$ $I_\mathrm{aniso}(\omega) \propto \int e^{i\omega t}\,C_\mathrm{aniso}(t)\,dt.$

An isotropic media (liquids, gases), the observable Raman spectra under unpolarized detection is a rotational average of the two components:

$I_\mathrm{Raman}(\omega) = I_\mathrm{iso}(\omega) + \frac{4}{3}\,I_\mathrm{aniso}(\omega).$

This expression is derived from the angular momentum averaging of scattered lights from the random molecular orientations.

The factor 4/3 the iso/aniso probably contribution.

And the depolarization ratio, often used experimentally to featurize the polarization effects, is defied by:

$\rho(\omega) = \frac{I_\perp(\omega)}{I_\parallel(\omega)}= \frac{3\,I_\mathrm{aniso}(\omega)}{45\,I_\mathrm{iso}(\omega) + 4\,I_\mathrm{aniso}(\omega)}.$

The ratio show the information on the symmetry of the vibrational modes.

So, from the time dependent polarizability tensor $\boldsymbol{\alpha}(t)$, the isotropic and anisotropic time series can be obtained. Their autocorrelation functions are calculated, Fourier transformed, and finally combined using the rotational averaging method to generate the total Raman spectrum.

This polarizability-autocorrelation Fourier transform method naturally integrates anharmonic coupling, temperature broadening, and the polarization effects. It is providing a realistic description of Raman spectroscopy beyond the harmonic approximation.

=== Machine learning approach ===
In addition to these physics-based approaches, researchers have applied machine learning to predict the interatomic potential that is the basis for Raman spectrum predictions. This approach to predicting the potential saves computational time, enabling predictions for complex molecules. The prediction of the Raman spectrum from the machine-learning potential remains the same as described above.

== See also ==
- Infrared spectroscopy
- Raman scattering
- Resonance Raman spectroscopy
- Surface-enhanced Raman spectroscopy
