= Resonance Raman spectroscopy =

Raman spectroscopy technique

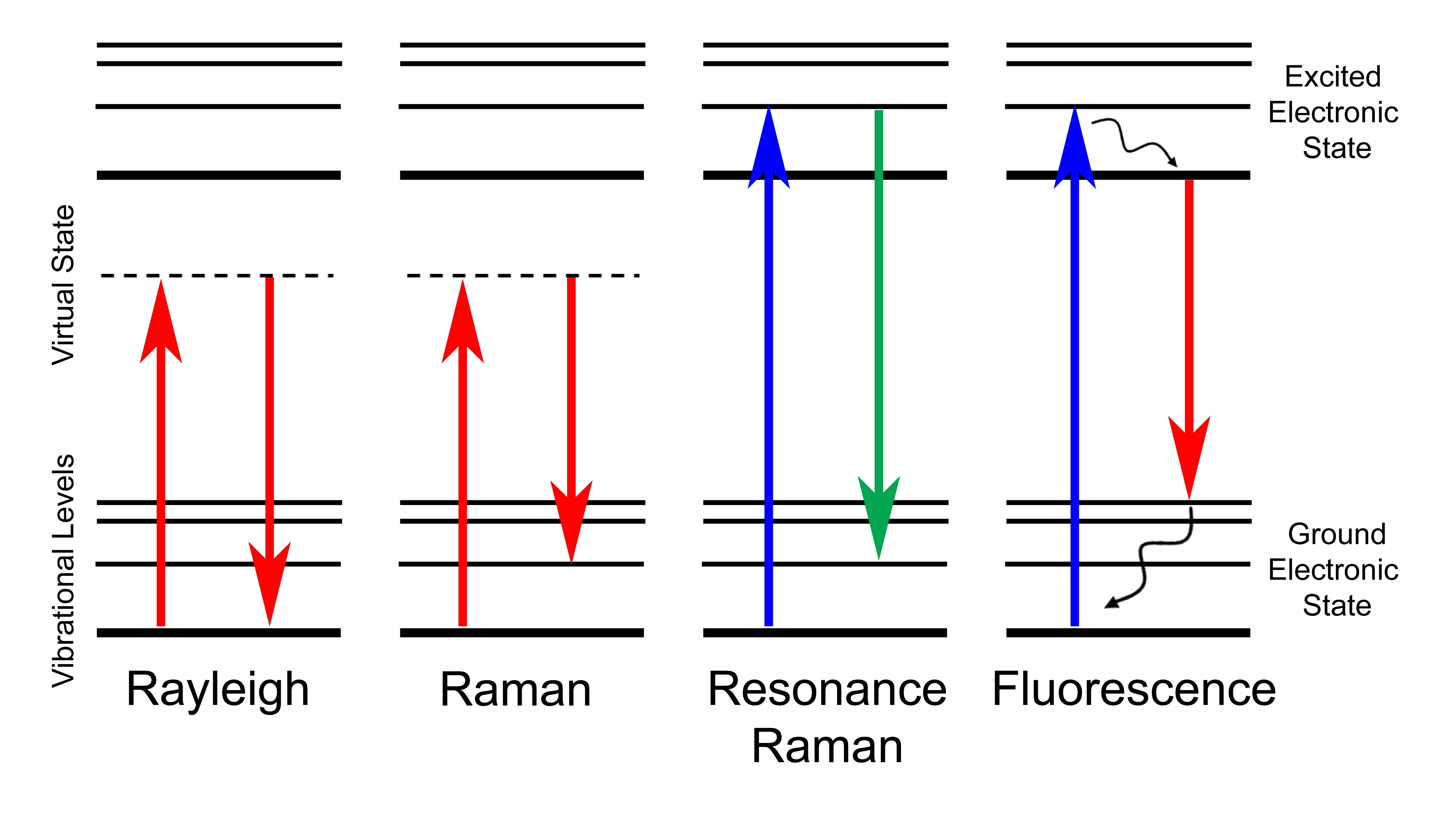
Energy level diagram showing relationship between Rayleigh, Raman, and resonance Raman scattering and fluorescence.

Resonance Raman spectroscopy (RR spectroscopy or RRS) is a variant of Raman spectroscopy in which the incident photon energy is close in energy to an electronic transition of a compound or material under examination. This similarity in energy (resonance) leads to greatly increased intensity of the Raman scattering of certain vibrational modes, compared to ordinary Raman spectroscopy.

Resonance Raman spectroscopy has much greater sensitivity than non-resonance Raman spectroscopy, allowing for the analysis of compounds with inherently weak Raman scattering intensities, or at very low concentrations. It also selectively enhances only certain molecular vibrations (those of the chemical group undergoing the electronic transition), which simplifies spectra. For large molecules such as proteins, this selectivity helps to identify vibrational modes of specific parts of the molecule or protein, such as the heme unit within myoglobin. Resonance Raman spectroscopy has been used in the characterization of inorganic compounds and complexes, proteins, nucleic acids, pigments, and in archaeology and art history.

== Theory ==
In Raman scattering, photons collide with a sample and are scattered with a difference in energy: The scattered photons may be higher or lower in energy (have a shorter or longer wavelength) than the incident photons. This difference in energy is caused by coupling of the photon with the vibrations of the sample, resulting in a transition to a higher or lower vibrational energy level: if the sample was initially in an elevated vibrational state, the scattered photon may be higher in energy than the incident photon (anti-Stokes Raman scattering). Otherwise, the scattered photon has a lower energy than the incoming photon (Stokes Raman scattering). Among the two phenomena, Stokes shift and anti-Stokes shift, the former is the most likely to occur. As a consequence, the relative intensity of Raman spectra acquired in Stokes mode is more intense than the other. For most materials, Raman scattering is extremely weak compared to Rayleigh scattering, in which light is scattered without loss of energy. Raman-scattered light, which contains information about vibrational transitions, is therefore difficult to observe for many substances.

Resonance Raman spectroscopy takes advantage of an increase in the intensity of Raman scattering cross-section when the incident photons match the energy of an electronic transition. If the energy of the photon striking the sample is equal or close to that of an electronic transition in the sample, certain Raman-active vibrational modes—those producing nuclear displacement in the same direction as the electronic transition—will exhibit greatly enhanced scattering, up to 10^{6}-fold compared to nonresonance Raman. For totally symmetric modes, this increased scattering intensity results from so-called A-term or Franck-Condon scattering, due to the nonzero Franck-Condon overlaps between ground and excited states. Nontotally symmetric modes may also be enhanced by B-term or Herzberg-Teller scattering, if the symmetry of the mode is contained in the direct product of the two electronic state symmetries. Resonance enhancement is most apparent in the case of π-π* transitions and least for metal centered (d–d) transitions. Like ordinary Raman spectroscopy, RRS observes vibrational transitions producing a nonzero change in the polarizability of the molecule or material being studied.

Resonance Raman scattering differs from fluorescence in that it occurs without vibrational relaxation during the lifetime of the excited electronic state. It thus exhibits much narrower line widths than fluorescence. However, fluorescence and resonance Raman scattering co-occur in many materials, and interference from fluorescence may complicate the collection of resonance Raman spectra.

== Variants ==
Typically, resonance Raman spectroscopy is performed in the same manner as ordinary Raman spectroscopy, using a single laser light source to illuminate the sample. The difference is the choice of the laser wavelength, which must be selected to match the energy of an electronic transition in the sample. A tunable laser is thus often used for resonance Raman spectroscopy, since a single laser can be used to generate many possible source wavelengths to match different samples. By using multiple lasers, pulsed lasers, and/or certain sample preparation techniques, a range of more sophisticated variants of RRS can be performed, including:

- Time-resolved resonance Raman spectroscopy: By using pulsed lasers with a controllable delay between pulses, resonance Raman spectroscopy can be used to monitor changes in the sample over time, following a laser-induced photochemical change or temperature increase. This method has been used to examine the dynamics of excited electronic states, binding of oxygen or other gases to heme-containing proteins, and protein dynamics.
- Resonance hyper-Raman spectroscopy: Excitation of the sample occurs by two-photon absorption, rather than by absorption of a single photon. This arrangement allows for excitation of modes that are forbidden in ordinary resonance Raman spectroscopy, with intensity enhancement due to resonance, and also simplifies collection of scattered light. It is especially useful for molecules that are both polar and polarizable.
- Surface-enhanced resonance Raman spectroscopy: A hybrid of RRS and surface-enhanced Raman scattering. The sample is applied to conducting nanoparticles and a laser matching the surface plasmon resonance of the nanoparticles is used as source. If the wavelength of the surface plasmon matches that of an electronic transition in the sample, the Raman scattering will be greatly enhanced compared to ordinary RRS.
- Resonance Raman microscopy: A microscope is used to focus the source laser onto a particular point in the sample, and spectra are collected for many such points. The Raman intensity at different points can then be assembled into a microscopic image of the sample. By appropriate choice of source wavelength, a microscopic map of the distribution only of a component of interest can be made.

== Applications ==
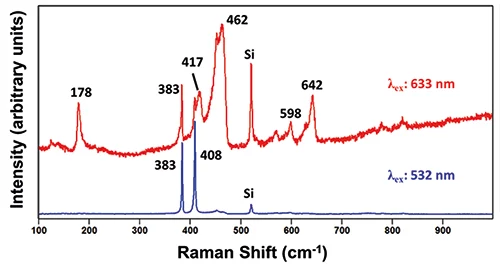
Resonance (top) and nonresonance (bottom) Raman spectra of MoS_{2} on silicon. Note that use of a source wavelength of 633 nm, near an electronic transition, causes appearance of bands that are too faint to be visible with a 532 nm source. Figure courtesy of David Tuschel.

Because of its selectivity and sensitivity, resonance Raman spectroscopy is typically used to study molecular vibrations in compounds that would have very weak and/or complex Raman spectra in the absence of resonance enhancement. Like ordinary Raman spectroscopy, resonance Raman is compatible with samples in water, which has a very weak scattering intensity and little contribution to spectra. However, the need for a source laser with a wavelength matching that of an electronic transition in the analyte of interest somewhat limits the applicability of the method.

=== Pigments and dyes ===
Dyes and pigments, all of which exhibit electronic transitions in the visible part of the electromagnetic spectrum, were among the first substances to be studied by resonance Raman spectroscopy. Resonance Raman spectra of beta-carotene and lycopene in intact plant samples were reported in 1970. Since then, the method has been used to noninvasively measure levels of these nutrients in human skin. The resonance Raman spectra of other polyene pigments, such as spheroidene and retinal, have been used to identify differences in chromophore conformation in photoactive proteins. Resonance Raman spectroscopy has been used in archaeology to identify dyes and pigments in cultural artifacts, and the ability of RRS to distinguish different modern inks and dyes has found application in forensic science.

=== Proteins ===
Proteins have been widely examined by resonance Raman spectroscopy. Protein-bound cofactors that absorb in the visible wavelength range, such as heme, flavins, or transition metal complexes, can be examined by RRS with minimal spectral overlap from the rest of the molecule. This method has been used to examine gas binding in hemeproteins and the catalytic cycle of various enzymes. Using ultraviolet laser excitation, it is possible to selectively excite the sidechains of aromatic amino acids (phenylalanine, tyrosine, and tryptophan) to deduce the local environment and hydrogen-bonding interactions by these residues. With shorter-wavelength ("deep") ultraviolet excitation, it is also possible to excite the peptide bonds of a protein in order to examine secondary structure. Protein folding and denaturation have been examined using deep-UV resonance Raman spectroscopy of the polypeptide backbone, with excitation wavelengths shorter than 200 nm.

=== Nucleic acids and viruses ===
Resonance Raman spectroscopy with ultraviolet excitation can be used to examine the chemistry, structure, and intermolecular interactions of nucleic acids, specifically the bases. Interactions between nucleic acids and DNA-binding compounds such as drugs can be examined by selectively exciting either the nucleobases or the drug itself. The resonance Raman spectra of DNA can be used to identify bacterial DNA in living cells, and to quantitate DNA under different culture conditions, and even to distinguish different bacterial species. Viruses have also been studied using UV resonance Raman spectroscopy; the method has the capability to separately interrogate the structure of the nucleic acid or capsid protein components of the virus, through the choice of the appropriate excitation wavelength.

=== Nanomaterials ===
Resonance Raman spectroscopy has also been used to characterize the structure and photophysical properties of nanoparticles. Using lasers tuned to the visible and near-infrared electronic transitions of carbon nanotubes, it is possible to enhance structure-sensitive vibrational bands of the nanotubes. Nanowires of inorganic semiconductor materials including gallium phosphide and carbon-encapsulated mercury telluride have also been shown to exhibit resonance Raman spectra with visible excitation light.

== See also ==
- Scattering
- Rayleigh scattering
- X-ray Raman spectroscopy
- Coherent anti-Stokes Raman spectroscopy
- Tip-enhanced Raman spectroscopy
- Vibronic spectroscopy
- Depolarization ratio
