= Leonid Mandelstam =

Soviet physicist (1879–1944)

- Born: Leonid Isaakovich Mandelstam; 4 May 1879; Mogilev, Mogilev Governorate, Russian Empire
- Died: 27 November 1944 (aged 65); Moscow, Russian SFSR, Soviet Union
- Education: Novorossiya University; University of Strasbourg
- Known for: Quantum speed limit
- Scientific career
- Doctoral advisor: Karl Ferdinand Braun
- Doctoral students: Aleksandr Andronov; Mikhail Leontovich; Sergei Rytov; Igor Tamm

Leonid Isaakovich Mandelstam or Mandelshtam (Russian: Леонид Исаакович Мандельштам, IPA: [lʲɪɐˈnʲit ɨsɐˈakəvʲɪtɕ mənʲdʲɪlʲˈʂtam]; 4 May 1879 – 27 November 1944) was a Soviet and Russian physicist.

== Life ==
Leonid Mandelstam was born in Mogilev, in the Russian Empire (now in Belarus) into a Jewish family. He studied at the Novorossiya University in Odessa, but was expelled in 1899 due to political activities, and continued his studies at the University of Strasbourg. He remained in Strasbourg until 1914, and returned with the beginning of World War I. He was awarded the Stalin Prize in 1942. He died in Moscow, aged 65.

== Scientific achievements ==
The main emphasis of his work was broadly considered theory of oscillations, which included optics and quantum mechanics. He was a co-discoverer of inelastic combinational scattering of light used now in Raman spectroscopy (see below). This paradigm-altering discovery (together with Grigory Landsberg) had occurred at the Moscow State University just one week earlier than a parallel discovery of the same phenomena by C. V. Raman and K. S. Krishnan. In Russian literature it is called "combinational scattering of light" (from combination of frequencies of photons and molecular vibrations) but in English it is named after Raman.

=== Discovery of the combinational scattering of light ===
In 1918, Mandelstam theoretically predicted the fine structure splitting in Rayleigh scattering due to light scattering on thermal acoustic waves. Beginning from 1926, Mandelstam and Landsberg initiated experimental studies on vibrational scattering of light in crystals at the Moscow State University. As a result of this research, Landsberg and Mandelstam discovered the effect of the combinational scattering of light on 21 February 1928. They presented this fundamental discovery for the first time at a colloquium on 27 April 1928. They published brief reports about this discovery (experimental results with some attempt at a theoretical explanation) in Russian and in German and then published a comprehensive paper in Zeitschrift für Physik.

In the same year, two Indian scientists C. V. Raman and K. S. Krishnan also observed the inelastic scattering of light. Raman stated that "The line spectrum of the new radiation was first seen on 28 February 1928". Thus, combinational scattering of light was observed by Mandelstam and Landsberg a week earlier than by Raman and Krishnan. However, according to the Physics Nobel Committee, Mandelstam and Landsberg were unable to provide an independent, complete interpretation for the discovery, as they only later cited Raman's article. Also, their observations were limited to crystals, whereas Raman and Krishnan showed the effect in solids, liquids, and vapors, thus proving the universal nature of the effect. Raman's method was further applied with great success in different fields of molecular physics, for example in the composition analysis of liquids, gases, and solids, and provided significant insight on nuclear spins. Hence, the light-scattering phenomenon became known as Raman scattering or the Raman effect.

Mandelstam's lectures in optics dated by 1944 can be considered as the formal beginning of the second stage of the DNG-metamaterials theory.

== Scientific school and legacy ==
Mandelstam founded one of the two major schools of theoretical physics in the Soviet Union (another being due to Lev Landau). In particular, he was mentor to Igor Tamm, a Nobel Prize in Physics laureate who in turn was a mentor to Vitaly Ginzburg who also received a Nobel Prize in Physics and Andrei Sakharov, the "father of Soviet hydrogen bomb" and a Nobel Peace Prize laureate.

A crater on the far side of the Moon is named after Mandelstam.

== See also ==
- Brillouin scattering
- Quantum tunnelling
- Quantum speed limit

== Selected publications ==
- L. I. Mandelstam, I. E. Tamm "The uncertainty relation between energy and time in nonrelativistic quantum mechanics", Izv. Akad. Nauk SSSR (ser. fiz.) 9, 122–128 (1945). English translation: J. Phys. (USSR) 9, 249–254 (1945).
