= Surface-enhanced Raman spectroscopy =

Spectroscopic technique

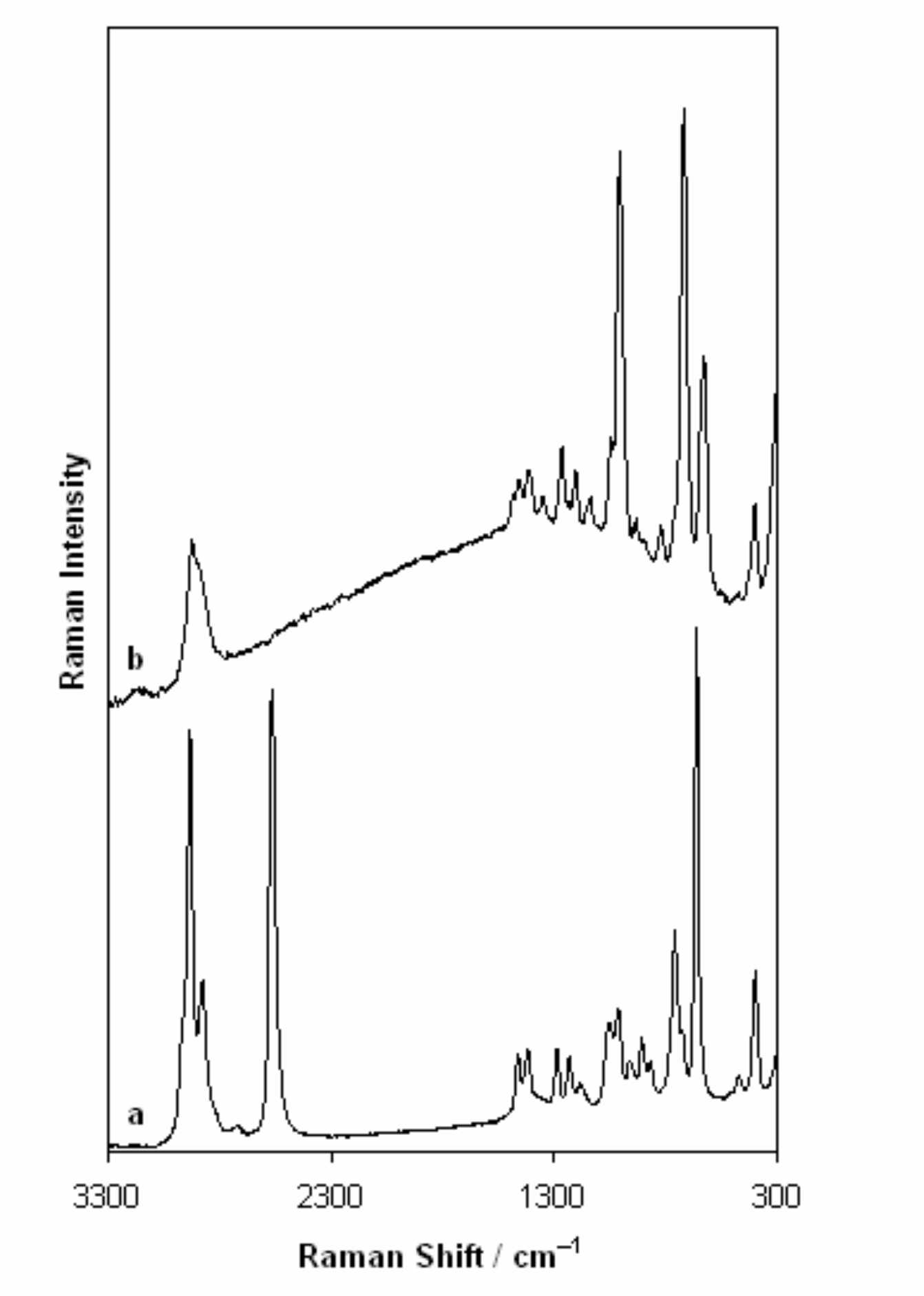
Raman spectrum of liquid 2-mercaptoethanol (below) and SERS spectrum of 2-mercaptoethanol monolayer formed on roughened silver (above). Spectra are scaled and shifted for clarity. A difference in selection rules is visible: Some bands appear only in the bulk-phase Raman spectrum or only in the SERS spectrum.

Surface-enhanced Raman spectroscopy or surface-enhanced Raman scattering (SERS) is a surface-sensitive technique that enhances Raman scattering by molecules adsorbed on rough metal surfaces known as nanoantennas or by nanostructures such as plasmonic-magnetic silica nanotubes. The enhancement factor can be as much as 10^{10} to 10^{11}, which means the technique may detect single molecules.

== History ==
SERS from pyridine adsorbed on electrochemically roughened silver was first observed by Martin Fleischmann, Patrick J. Hendra and A. James McQuillan at the Department of Chemistry at the University of Southampton, UK in 1973. The 40th Anniversary of the first observation of the SERS effect has been marked by the Royal Society of Chemistry by the award of a National Chemical Landmark plaque to the University of Southampton. In 1977, two groups independently noted that the concentration of scattering species could not account for the enhanced signal and each proposed a mechanism for the observed enhancement. Their theories are still accepted as explaining the SERS effect. Jeanmaire and Richard Van Duyne proposed an electromagnetic effect, while Albrecht and Creighton proposed a charge-transfer effect. Rufus Ritchie, of Oak Ridge National Laboratory's Health Sciences Research Division, predicted the existence of the surface plasmon.

== Mechanisms ==
The exact mechanism of the enhancement effect of SERS is still a matter of debate in the literature. There are two primary theories and while their mechanisms differ substantially, distinguishing them experimentally has not been straightforward. The electromagnetic theory proposes the excitation of localized surface plasmons, while the chemical theory proposes the formation of charge-transfer complexes. The chemical theory is based on resonance Raman spectroscopy, in which the frequency coincidence (or resonance) of the incident photon energy and electron transition greatly enhances Raman scattering intensity. Research in 2015 on a more powerful extension of the SERS technique called SLIPSERS (Slippery Liquid-Infused Porous SERS) has further supported the EM theory.

=== Electromagnetic theory ===
The increase in intensity of the Raman signal for adsorbates on particular surfaces occurs because of an enhancement in the electric field provided by the surface. When the incident light in the experiment strikes the surface, localized surface plasmons are excited. The field enhancement is greatest when the plasmon frequency, ω_{p}, is in resonance with the radiation ($\omega = \omega_p/\sqrt 3$ for spherical particles). In order for scattering to occur, the plasmon oscillations must be perpendicular to the surface; if they are in-plane with the surface, no scattering will occur. It is because of this requirement that roughened surfaces or arrangements of nanoparticles are typically employed in SERS experiments as these surfaces provide an area on which these localized collective oscillations can occur. SERS enhancement can occur even when an excited molecule is relatively far apart from the surface which hosts metallic nanoparticles enabling surface plasmon phenomena.

The light incident on the surface can excite a variety of phenomena in the surface, yet the complexity of this situation can be minimized by surfaces with features much smaller than the wavelength of the light, as only the dipolar contribution will be recognized by the system. The dipolar term contributes to the plasmon oscillations, which leads to the enhancement. The SERS effect is so pronounced because the field enhancement occurs twice. First, the field enhancement magnifies the intensity of incident light, which will excite the Raman modes of the molecule being studied, therefore increasing the signal of the Raman scattering. The Raman signal is then further magnified by the surface due to the same mechanism that excited the incident light, resulting in a greater increase in the total output. At each stage the electric field is enhanced as E^{2}, for a total enhancement of E^{4}.

The enhancement is not equal for all frequencies. For those frequencies for which the Raman signal is only slightly shifted from the incident light, both the incident laser light and the Raman signal can be near resonance with the plasmon frequency, leading to the E^{4} enhancement. When the frequency shift is large, the incident light and the Raman signal cannot both be on resonance with ω_{p}, thus the enhancement at both stages cannot be maximal.

The choice of surface metal is also dictated by the plasmon resonance frequency. Visible and near-infrared radiation (NIR) are used to excite Raman modes. Silver and gold are typical metals for SERS experiments because their plasmon resonance frequencies fall within these wavelength ranges, providing maximal enhancement for visible and NIR light. Copper's absorption spectrum also falls within the range acceptable for SERS experiments. Platinum and palladium nanostructures also display plasmon resonance within visible and NIR frequencies.

=== Chemical theory ===
Resonance Raman spectroscopy explains the huge enhancement of Raman scattering intensity. Intermolecular and intramolecular charge transfers significantly enhance Raman spectrum peaks. In particular, the enhancement is huge for species adsorbing the metal surface due to the high-intensity charge transfers from the metal surface with wide band to the adsorbing species. This resonance Raman enhancement is dominant in SERS for species on small nanoclusters with considerable band gaps, because surface plasmon appears only in metal surface with near-zero band gaps. This chemical mechanism probably occurs in concert with the electromagnetic mechanism for metal surface.

== Surfaces ==
While SERS can be performed in colloidal solutions, today the most common method for performing SERS measurements is by depositing a liquid sample onto a silicon or glass surface with a nanostructured noble metal surface. While the first experiments were performed on electrochemically roughened silver, now surfaces are often prepared using a distribution of metal nanoparticles on the surface as well as using lithography or porous silicon as a support. Two dimensional silicon nanopillars decorated with silver have also been used to create SERS active substrates. The most common metals used for plasmonic surfaces in visible light SERS are silver and gold; however, aluminium has recently been explored as an alternative plasmonic material, because its plasmon band is in the UV region, contrary to silver and gold. Hence, there is great interest in using aluminium for UV SERS. It has, however, surprisingly also been shown to have a large enhancement in the infrared, which is not fully understood. In the current decade, it has been recognized that the cost of SERS substrates must be reduced in order to become a commonly used analytical chemistry measurement technique. To meet this need, plasmonic paper has experienced widespread attention in the field, with highly sensitive SERS substrates being formed through approaches such as soaking, in-situ synthesis, screen printing and inkjet printing.

The shape and size of the metal nanoparticles strongly affect the strength of the enhancement because these factors influence the ratio of absorption and scattering events. There is an ideal size for these particles, and an ideal surface thickness for each experiment. If concentration and particle size can be tuned better for each experiment this will go a long way in the cost reduction of substrates. Particles that are too large allow the excitation of multipoles, which are nonradiative. As only the dipole transition leads to Raman scattering, the higher-order transitions will cause a decrease in the overall efficiency of the enhancement. Particles that are too small lose their electrical conductance and cannot enhance the field. When the particle size approaches a few atoms, the definition of a plasmon does not hold, as there must be a large collection of electrons to oscillate together. An ideal SERS substrate must possess high uniformity and high field enhancement. Such substrates can be fabricated on a wafer scale and label-free superresolution microscopy has also been demonstrated using the fluctuations of surface enhanced Raman scattering signal on such highly uniform, high-performance plasmonic metasurfaces.

Due to their unique physical and chemical properties, two-dimensional (2D) materials have gained significant attention as alternative substrates for surface-enhanced Raman spectroscopy (SERS). The use of 2D materials as SERS substrates offers several advantages over traditional metal substrates, including high sensitivity, reproducibility, and chemical stability.

Graphene is one of the most widely studied 2D materials for SERS applications. Graphene has a high surface area, high electron mobility, and excellent chemical stability, making it an attractive substrate for SERS. Graphene-based SERS sensors have also been shown to be highly reproducible and stable, making them attractive for real-world applications. In addition to graphene, other 2D materials, especially MXenes, have also been investigated for SERS applications. MXenes have a high surface area, good electrical conductivity, and chemical stability, making them attractive for SERS applications. As a result, MXene-based SERS sensors have been used to detect various analytes, including organic molecules, drugs and their metabolites.

As research and development continue, 2D materials-based SERS sensors will likely be more widely used in various industries, including environmental monitoring, healthcare, and food safety.

== Applications ==
SERS substrates are used to detect the presence of low-abundance biomolecules, and can therefore detect proteins in bodily fluids. Early detection of pancreatic cancer biomarkers was accomplished using SERS-based immunoassay approach. A SERS-base multiplex protein biomarker detection platform in a microfluidic chip is used to detect several protein biomarkers to predict the type of disease and critical biomarkers and increase the chance of differentiating diseases with similar biomarkers like pancreatic cancer, ovarian cancer, and pancreatitis. This technology has been utilized to detect urea and blood plasma label free in human serum and may become the next generation in cancer detection and screening.

The ability to analyze the composition of a mixture at a nanoscale makes the use of SERS substrates that are beneficial for environmental analysis, pharmaceuticals, material sciences, art and archaeological research, forensic science, drug and explosives detection, food quality analysis, and single algal cell detection. SERS combined with plasmonic sensing can be used for high-sensitivity quantitative analysis of small molecules in human biofluids, the quantitative detection of biomolecular interaction, the detection of low-level cancer biomarkers via sandwich immunoassay platforms, the label-free characterization of exosomes, and the study of redox processes at a single-molecule level.

SERS is a powerful technique for determining structural information about molecular systems. It has found a wide range of applications in ultra-sensitive chemical sensing and environmental analyses.

A review of the present and future applications of SERS was published in 2020.

== Selection rules ==
The term surface enhanced Raman spectroscopy implies that it provides the same information that traditional Raman spectroscopy does, simply with a greatly enhanced signal. While the spectra of most SERS experiments are similar to the non-surface enhanced spectra, there are often differences in the number of modes present. Additional modes not found in the traditional Raman spectrum can be present in the SERS spectrum, while other modes can disappear. The modes observed in any spectroscopic experiment are dictated by the symmetry of the molecules and are usually summarized by Selection rules. When molecules are adsorbed to a surface, the symmetry of the system can change, slightly modifying the symmetry of the molecule, which can lead to differences in mode selection.

One common way in which selection rules are modified arises from the fact that many molecules that have a center of symmetry lose that feature when adsorbed to a surface. The loss of a center of symmetry eliminates the requirements of the mutual exclusion rule, which dictates that modes can only be either Raman or infrared active. Thus modes that would normally appear only in the infrared spectrum of the free molecule can appear in the SERS spectrum.

A molecule's symmetry can be changed in different ways depending on the orientation in which the molecule is attached to the surface. In some experiments, it is possible to determine the orientation of adsorption to the surface from the SERS spectrum, as different modes will be present depending on how the symmetry is modified.

== Remote SERS ==
Remote surface-enhanced Raman spectroscopy (SERS) consists of using metallic nanowaveguides supporting propagating surface plasmon polaritons (SPPs) to perform SERS at a distant location different to that of the incident laser.

Propagating SPPs supported by nanowires has been used to show the remote excitation., as well as the remote detection of SERS. A silver nanowire was also used to show remote excitation and detection using graphene as Raman scatterer

Applications

Different plasmonic systems have already been used to show Raman detection of biomolecules in vivo in cells and remote excitation of surface catalytic reactions.

== Immunoassays ==
SERS-based immunoassays can be used for detection of low-abundance biomarkers. For example, antibodies and gold particles can be used to quantify proteins in serum with high sensitivity and specificity.

=== Oligonucleotide targeting ===
SERS can be used to target specific DNA and RNA sequences using a combination of gold and silver nanoparticles and Raman-active dyes, such as Cy3. Specific single nucleotide polymorphisms (SNP) can be identified using this technique. The gold nanoparticles facilitate the formation of a silver coating on the dye-labelled regions of DNA or RNA, allowing SERS to be performed. This has several potential applications: For example, Cao et al. report that gene sequences for HIV, Ebola, Hepatitis, and Bacillus Anthracis can be uniquely identified using this technique. Each spectrum was specific, which is advantageous over fluorescence detection; some fluorescent markers overlap and interfere with other gene markers. The advantage of this technique to identify gene sequences is that several Raman dyes are commercially available, which could lead to the development of non-overlapping probes for gene detection.

== See also ==
- Tip-enhanced Raman spectroscopy
