= Swan band =

Emission spectra characteristic of burning hydrocarbon fuels

Spectrum of the blue flame from a butane torch showing excited molecular radical band emission and Swan bands.

Swan bands consist of several sequences of vibrational bands scattered throughout the visible spectrum. They are a characteristic of the spectra of carbon stars, comets and burning hydrocarbon fuels. The bands are named for the Scottish physicist William Swan, who first studied the spectral analysis of radical diatomic carbon (C_{2}) in 1856.

== See also ==
- Spectroscopy
