= Grigory Landsberg =

Soviet physicist

Grigory Samuilovich Landsberg
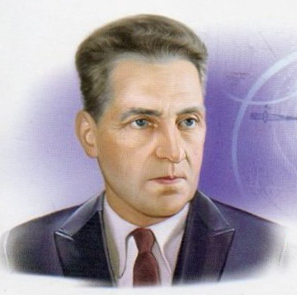
- Landsberg on a Russian postcard
- Born: 22 January 1890; Vologda, Vologda Governorate, Russian Empire
- Died: 2 February 1957 (aged 67); Moscow, USSR
- Citizenship: USSR
- Education: Moscow State University
- Known for: Raman Scattering
- Awards: Order of Lenin
- Scientific career
- Fields: Physics, optics, spectroscopy

Grigory Samuilovich Landsberg (Russian: Григорий Самуилович Ландсберг; 22 January 1890 – 2 February 1957) was a Soviet physicist who worked in the fields of optics and spectroscopy. Together with Leonid Mandelstam he co-discovered inelastic combinational scattering of light, which is known as Raman scattering.

== Vitae ==
Landsberg graduated from the Moscow State University in 1913 and then taught there from 1913 to 1915, 1923–1945, and 1947–1951 (Professor since 1923). From 1934, he simultaneously worked also in the Physical Institute of the Academy of Sciences of the USSR. From 1951 to 1957 he was a professor at the Moscow Institute of Physics and Technology.

Landsberg conducted pioneering studies on the vibrational scattering of light in crystals beginning in 1926. In 1928, Landsberg and Mandelstam discovered a phenomenon of combinational scattering of light (this phenomenon became known as Raman scattering or the Raman effect independently discovered by C. V. Raman and K. S. Krishnan in liquids). Landsberg discovered the fine structure in Rayleigh scattering. In 1931, he discovered a phenomenon of selective scattering of light.

He laid the foundation for the spectroscopy of organic molecules and the studies on inter- and intra-molecular interactions in the gaseous, liquid and solid phases in the USSR.

He founded a major school on atomic and molecular spectral analysis. He developed techniques for the spectral analysis of metals and alloys (USSR Government Prize, 1941), and for the analysis of complex organic mixtures, including motor fuels. He is the author of the famous course of "Optics", and editor of the most popular "Elementary Textbook on Physics" (Volumes 1–3, 7th Edition, 1971).

In 1946 he became a full member of the Soviet Academy of Sciences. He later founded the Commission on Spectroscopy at the academy, which in 1968 was transformed into the Institute for Spectroscopy Russian Academy of Sciences.

Landsberg was awarded two Orders of Lenin and several medals.

== Discovery of the combinational scattering of light ==
Beginning in 1926, Mandelstam and Landsberg initiated experimental studies on the vibrational scattering of light in crystals at the Moscow State University. Their intention was to prove the theoretical prediction made by Mandelstam in 1918 regarding the fine structure splitting in Rayleigh scattering due to light scattering on thermal acoustic waves. As a result of this research, Landsberg and Mandelstam discovered the effect of the inelastic combinational scattering of light on 21 February 1928 ("combinational" – from the combination of frequencies of photons and molecular vibrations). They presented this fundamental discovery for the first time at a colloquium on 27 April 1928. They published brief reports about this discovery (experimental results with theoretical explanation) in Russian and in German and then published a comprehensive paper in Zeitschrift für Physik.

In the same year of 1928, two Indian scientists C. V. Raman and K. S. Krishnan were looking for the "Compton component" of scattered light in liquids and vapors. They found the same combinational scattering of light. Raman stated that "The line spectrum of the new radiation was first seen on 28 February 1928." Thus, combinational scattering of light was discovered by Mandelstam and Landsberg a week earlier than by Raman and Krishnan. However, the phenomenon became known as the Raman effect because Raman published his results earlier than Landsberg and Mandelstam did. Nonetheless, in Russian-language literature, it is traditionally called "combinational scattering of light".
