= Adolf Smekal =

Austrian theoretical physicist (1895-1959)

Adolf Gustav Stephan Smekal (12 September 1895 – 7 March 1959) was an Austrian theoretical physicist, with interests in solid state physics, known for the prediction of the inelastic scattering of photons (the Raman effect).

Adolf Smekal studied at the Vienna College of Technology (1912–1913), received his doctorate from the University of Graz (1913–1917), and then studied at the University of Berlin (1917–1919).
