= Depolarization ratio =

Measurement ratio in spectroscopy

In Raman spectroscopy, the depolarization ratio is the intensity ratio between the perpendicular component and the parallel component of Raman scattered light.

Early work in this field was carried out by George Placzek, who developed the theoretical treatment of bond polarizability.

The Raman scattered light is emitted by the stimulation of the electric field of the incident light. Therefore, the direction of the vibration of the electric field, or polarization direction, of the scattered light might be expected to be the same as that of the incident light. In reality, however, some fraction of the Raman scattered light has a polarization direction that is perpendicular to that of the incident light. This component is called the 'perpendicular component'. Naturally, the component of the Raman scattered light whose polarization direction is parallel to that of the incident light is called the 'parallel component', and the Raman scattered light consists of the parallel component and the perpendicular component.

The ratio of the peak intensity of the parallel and perpendicular component is known as the depolarization ratio (ρ), defined in equation 1.

$\rho = \frac{ I_{perpendicular} }{ I_{parallel} } \quad\textrm{or}\quad \frac{ I_{depolarized} }{ I_{polarized} }$

For example, a spectral band with a peak of intensity 10 units when the polarizers are parallel, and an intensity 1 unit when the polarizers are perpendicular, would have a depolarization ratio of 1/10 = 0.1, which corresponds to a highly polarized band.

The value of the depolarization ratio of a Raman band depends on the symmetry of the molecule and the normal vibrational mode, in other words, the point group of the molecule and its irreducible representation to which the normal mode belongs. Under Placzek's polarizability approximation, it is known that the depolarization ratio of a totally symmetric vibrational mode is less than 0.75, and that of the other modes equals 0.75. A Raman band whose depolarization ratio is less than 0.75 is called a 'polarized band', and a band with a depolarization ratio equal to or greater than 0.75 is called a 'depolarized band'.

For a spherical top molecule in which all three axes are equivalent, symmetric vibrations have Raman spectral bands which are completely polarized (ρ = 0). An example is the symmetric stretching or "breathing" mode of methane (CH_{4}) in which all four C−H bonds vibrate in phase. However, for the asymmetric mode in which one C−H bond stretches while the other three contract, the Raman scattered radiation is depolarized.

For molecules of lower symmetry (symmetric tops or asymmetric tops), a vibration with the full symmetry of the molecule leads to a polarized or partially polarized Raman band (ρ < 0.75), while a less symmetric vibration yields a depolarized band (ρ ≥ 0.75).
