= Rule of mutual exclusion =

The rule of mutual exclusion in molecular spectroscopy relates the observation of molecular vibrations to molecular symmetry. It states that no normal modes can be both Infrared and Raman active in a molecule that possesses a center of symmetry. This is a powerful application of group theory to vibrational spectroscopy, and allows one to easily detect the presence of this symmetry element by comparison of the IR and Raman spectra generated by the same molecule.

The rule arises because, in a centrosymmetric point group, a normal mode of vibration must have the same character (i.e. transform similarly, according to the same irreducible representation) under inversion as the property which generates it. IR active modes are generated by one of the components of the dipole moment vector. Vectors transform as spatial coordinates, and are thus of ungerade (u) symmetry, i.e. their character under inversion is -1. Thus, IR active modes must have character -1 under inversion.

Raman active modes, meanwhile, are generated by the polarizability tensor. Since tensor components transform as bilinear products of two spatial coordinates, they are invariant under inversion and are thus of gerade (g) symmetry, i.e. their character under inversion is +1. Thus, in the character table there is no irreducible representation that spans both IR and Raman active modes, and so there is no overlap between the two spectra.

This does not mean that a vibrational mode which is not Raman active must be IR active: in fact, it is still possible that a mode of a particular symmetry is neither Raman nor IR active. Such spectroscopically "silent" or "inactive" modes exist in molecules such as ethylene (C_{2}H_{4}), benzene (C_{6}H_{6}) and the tetrachloroplatinate ion (PtCl_{4}^{2−}).

== Applications and Examples ==
=== Centrosymmetric Molecule Example: Carbon Dioxide (CO_{2}) ===
The rule of mutual exclusion applies to molecules that possess a center of inversion. Carbon dioxide (CO_{2}) is a classic example that belongs to the D∞h point group and is centrosymmetric.

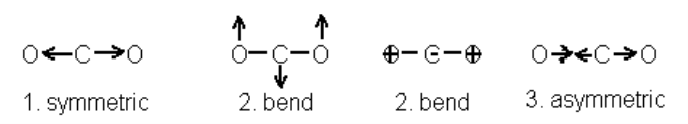
Vibrational modes of CO2.

Carbon dioxide has four fundamental vibrational modes:

- Symmetric stretch
- Two degenerate bending modes
- Asymmetric stretch

These vibrations can be classified as either gerade (g) or ungerade (u), depending on how they behave after inversion has been applied.

- Symmetric stretch is gerade meaning that it is Raman active but IR inactive
- Asymmetric stretch is ungerade meaning that it is IR active, but Raman inactive
- Bending modes are also ungerade meaning that they are IR active, but Raman inactive

It is because of the rule of mutual exclusion that a strict separation of activity can be demonstrated between infrared and Raman spectroscopy.

=== Non-centrosymmetric Molecule Example: Water (H_{2}O) ===
Molecules that do not have a center of inversion do not follow the rule of mutual exclusion. An example would be water (H_{2}O) which belongs to the C_{2}V point group.

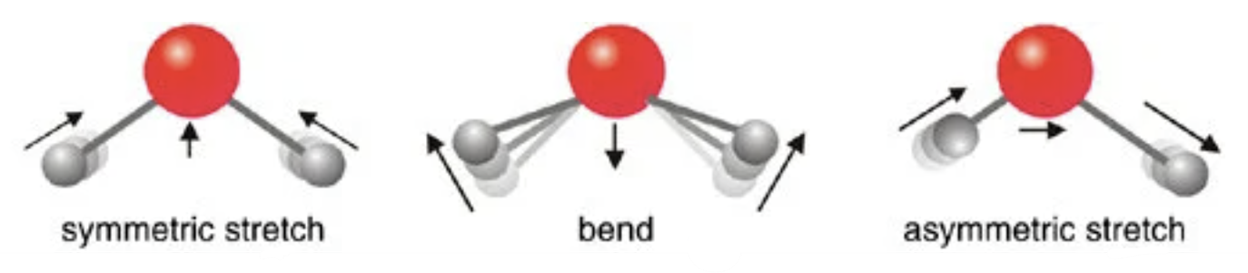
Vibrational modes of H2O.

Water has three vibrational modes:

- Symmetric stretch (A_{1})
- Bending Mode (A_{1})
- Asymmetric stretch (B_{2})

Using the C_{2}V character table we can see specific markers that show us IR and Raman activity:

- IR activity corresponds to x, y, or z
- Raman activity corresponds to quadratic functions (x^{2}, y^{2}, z^{2}, xy, xz, yz)

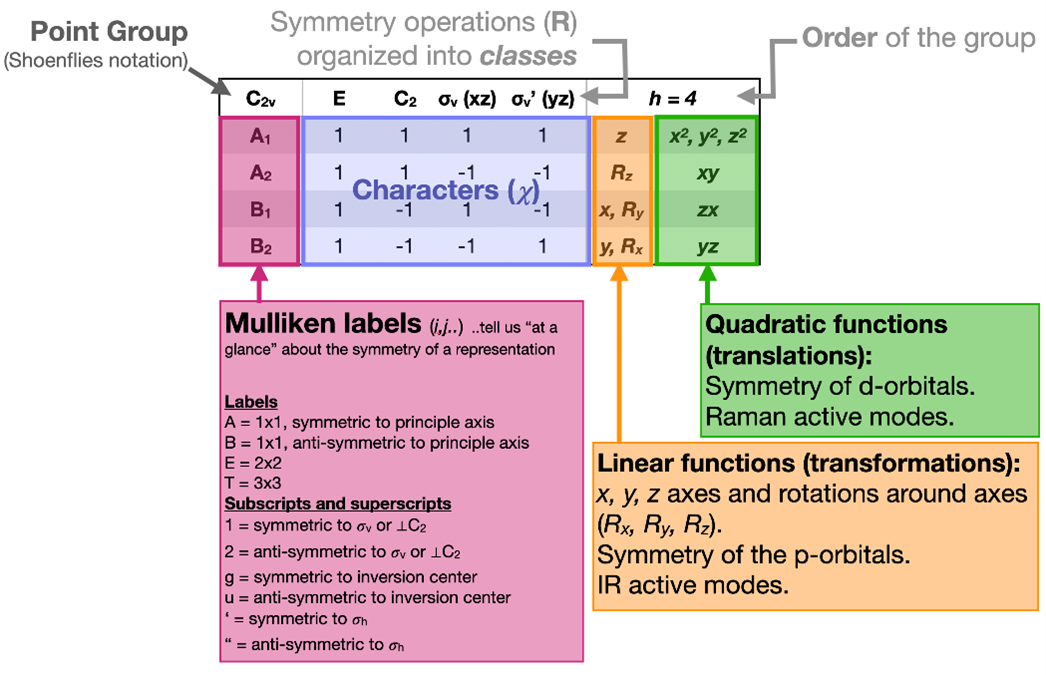
Explanation of character table using C2V as an example.

Both IR and Raman activity can be seen in all three vibrational modes. Both A_{1} and B_{2} modes are active in both IR and Raman spectra. For A_{1}, IR active is represented as z that is listed in the linear functions section of the character table. Raman is represented by x^{2}, y^{2}, z^{2} in the quadratic functions section of the character table. For B_{2}, y is representing IR active while yz is representing Raman active. This illustrates that the mutual exclusion rule does not apply to non-centrosymmetric molecules due to all vibrational modes of water being both IR and Raman active.
