= K. S. Krishnan =

Indian physicist (1898–1961)

Sir K. S. Krishnan FRS
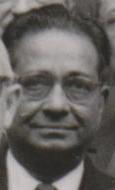
- K. S. Krishnan 1952 in London
- Born: 4 December 1898; Viluppanoor, Madura District, Madras Presidency, British India (now in Virudhunagar district, Tamil Nadu, India)
- Died: 14 June 1961 (aged 62); New Delhi, UT of Delhi (now NCT of Delhi), India
- Education: The American College in Madurai; Madras Christian College; University of Madras; Calcutta University
- Known for: Raman effect Crystal Magnetism; Magneto Chemistry; Technique for measuring Magnetic anisotropy of magnetic crystals
- Awards: FRS (1940); Padma Bhushan (1954); Knight Bachelor; Bhatnagar Award
- Scientific career
- Fields: Physics
- Workplaces: Madras Christian College; Indian Association for the Cultivation of Science; Dacca University; Allahabad University; National Physical Laboratory of India
- Academic advisors: CV Raman
- Notable students: Calamur Mahadevan

Sir Kariamanikkam Srinivasa Krishnan (4 December 1898 – 14 June 1961) was an Indian physicist. He was a co-discoverer of Raman scattering, for which his mentor C. V. Raman was awarded the 1930 Nobel Prize in Physics.

== Early life ==
Kariamanikkam Srinivasa Krishnan generally referred to as K. S. Krishnan or KSK, was born into a Vaishnavite brahmin family on 4 December 1898 in Viluppanoor, a village near Watrap in Virudhunagar district, Tamil Nadu, India. His father was a farmer-scholar deeply versed in Tamil literature. He had his early education in Hindu Higher Secondary school, in Watrap, after which he attended the American College in Madurai and the Madras Christian College. After gaining his degree in Physics he became a demonstrator in chemistry.

== Early career ==
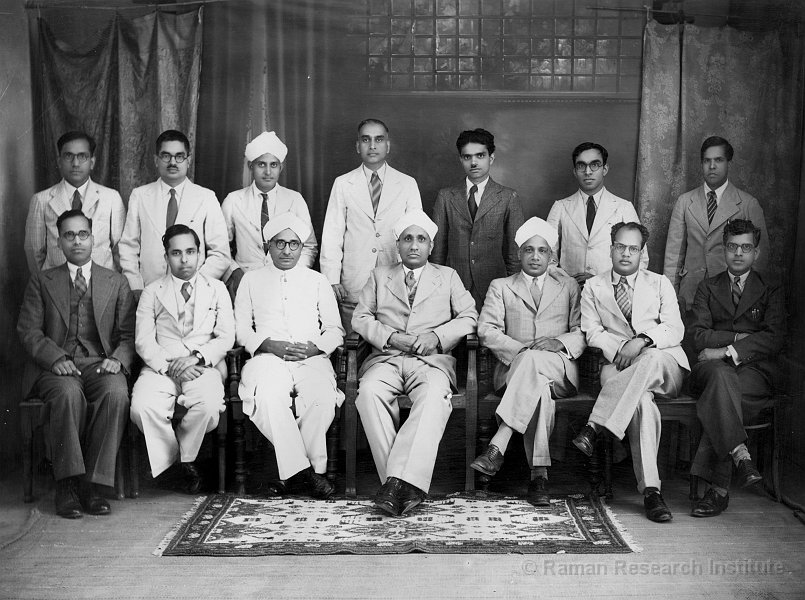
Krishnan seated third from left with C. V. Raman and others, c. 1929

In 1920, Krishnan went to work with C.V. Raman at the Indian Association for the Cultivation of Science, Kolkata (then Calcutta). There he engaged himself in experimental study of the scattering of light in a large number of liquids and its theoretical interpretations. He played a significant role in the discovery of the Raman scattering.

In 1928 he moved to the Dacca University (now in Bangladesh) as the Reader in the physics department where he studied magnetic properties of crystals in relation to their structure. Krishnan, along with other rising scientists such as Santilal Banerjee and B.C. Guha developed an elegant and precise experimental technique to measure the magnetic anisotropy of diamagnetic and paramagnetic crystals. Their findings were published by the Royal Society of London in 1933 under the title, Investigations on Magne-Crystallic Action.

In 1933 he returned to Kolkata to take up the post of Mahendralal Sircar Professor of Physics in the Indian Association for the Cultivation of Science where he continued to collaborate fruitfully with Banerjee to elaborate on the magnetic properties of crystals in relation to their structure. Their joint papers and communications (published in Nature, Terrestrial Magnetism and Atmospheric Electricity, and by the Royal Society), remain to this day, aside from a number of other pathbreaking contributions they also published in various Physics journals, the most definitive scientific studies on the structure and tendencies of small crystals. Their experiments in Dacca and continued collaborative research in Kolkata led to what is now known as the Krishnan Banerjee method for measuring the magnetic susceptibility of small crystals.

Krishnan was elected as Fellow of the Royal Society (FRS) in 1940. His Royal Society candidature certificate in 1935 read: "Distinguished for his investigations in molecular optics and in magne-crystalline action:collaborated with Sir C.V. Raman in extensive theoretical and experimental studies on light scattering, molecular optics and in the discovery of the Raman Effect (1928). More recently has been publishing many valuable investigations (Phil Trans Royal Society and elsewhere) on the significance of magnetic anisotropy in relation to crystal architecture and thermo-magnetic behaviour at the lowest temperatures. Has published important work on pleochroism in crystals and its relation to photo-dissociation. Leader of an active school of research in Calcutta."

In 1942, he moved to Allahabad University as Professor and Head of the Department of Physics where he took up the physics of solids, in particular of metals.

He was knighted in the 1946 Birthday Honours List and awarded the Padma Bhushan by the Government of India in 1954. He was the first recipient of the prestigious Bhatnagar Award in 1958.

On 4 January 1947 K. S. Krishnan was appointed first director of National Physical Laboratory India. This was one of the earliest national laboratories set up under the Council of Scientific and Industrial Research.

== Death ==
Krishnan died on 14 June at the age of 62 in New Delhi.

== Quotes about Krishnan ==
- What is remarkable about Krishnan is not that he is a great scientist but something much more. He is a perfect citizen, a whole man with an integrated personality. – Jawaharlal Nehru

== Collected works ==
The scientific papers of K. S. Krishnan have been published in 1988 by the National Physical Laboratory (located on Dr K.S. Krishnan Road, New Delhi 110012). The book of 950 pages has been made available in the Public Library of India collection of the Internet archive at https://archive.org/details/in.ernet.dli.2015.502306

== See also ==
- Raman scattering
- Magnetic anisotropy
