= Stimulated Raman spectroscopy =

Form of spectroscopy employed in physics, chemistry, biology, and other fields

Stimulated Raman spectroscopy, also referred to as stimulated Raman scattering (SRS), is a form of spectroscopy employed in physics, chemistry, biology, and other fields. The basic mechanism resembles that of spontaneous Raman spectroscopy: a pump photon, of the angular frequency $\omega_p$, which is scattered by a molecule has some small probability of inducing some vibrational (or rotational) transition, as opposed to inducing a direct transition through absorption. This makes the molecule emit a photon at a shifted frequency. However, SRS, as opposed to spontaneous Raman spectroscopy, is a third-order non-linear phenomenon involving a second photon—the Stokes photon of angular frequency $\omega_S$—which stimulates a specific transition. When the difference in frequency between both photons ($\omega_p-\omega_S$) resembles that of a specific vibrational (or rotational) transition ($\omega_\nu$) the occurrence of this transition is resonantly enhanced. In SRS, the signal is equivalent to changes in the intensity of the pump and Stokes beams. The signals are typically rather low, of the order of $10^{-5}$, thus requiring use of modulation-transfer techniques: one beam is modulated in amplitude, and the signal is detected on the other beam via a lock-in amplifier. Employing a pump laser beam of a constant frequency and a Stokes laser beam of a scanned frequency (or vice versa) allows for unraveling the molecule's spectral fingerprint. This spectral fingerprint differs from those obtained by other spectroscopy methods, such as infrared absorption, as the Raman transitions confer different selection rules.

== History ==
The phenomenon of SRS was accidentally discovered by Woodbury and Ng in 1962. In their experiment, they introduced a Kerr cell containing nitrobenzene into a ruby laser cavity to study Q-switching processes. This resulted in a strong emission at a wavelength in the IR region that could not be associated with the characteristic wavelengths of the ruby gain medium. At first, this was explained as luminescence. Only at a later stage was this interpreted correctly as the first experimental observation of SRS. A year later, Garmire et al. introduced a two-wave mixing framework to describe SRS. These pioneering works opened a new avenue of research and were followed by many theoretical and experimental works in the field of SRS.

== Principle ==
Molecule's energy levels and the SRS transition

=== Qualitative description ===
The principle of SRS can be intuitively understood by adopting the quantum mechanical description of the molecule's energy levels. Initially, the molecule lies in the ground state, its lowest electronic energy level. Then, it simultaneously absorbs both pump and Stokes photons, which causes a vibrational (or rotational) transition with some probability. The transition can be thought of as a two-step transition where, in the first step, the molecule is excited by the pump photon to a virtual state, and in the second, it is relaxed into a vibrational (or rotational) state other than the ground state. The virtual state, a superposition of real states' probability tails, cannot be occupied by the molecule. However, the simultaneous absorption of two photons might provide a coupling route between the initial and final states. When the energy difference between both pump and Stokes photons matches the energy difference between some vibrational (or rotational) state and the ground state, the probability for a transition due to this stimulated process is enhanced by orders of magnitude.

=== Quantitative description ===
Each photon that undergoes SRS is shifted in frequency from pump to Stokes frequency. Thus, the SRS signal is proportional to the decrease or increase in the pump, or Stokes beams intensities, respectively. The following rate equations describe these changes in the beams intensities

$$\frac{dI_S}{dz}=g_R I_pI_S-\alpha I_S,$$

$$\frac{dI_p}{dz}=-\frac{\omega_p}{\omega_S} g_\mathrm{R}I_pI_S-\alpha I_p,$$

where, $I_p$ and $I_S$ are the pump and Stokes beams intensities, respectively, $\omega_p$ and $\omega_S$ are the pump and Stokes angular frequencies, respectively, $z$ is the coordinate along which the beams propagate, $g_R$ is the Raman gain coefficient, and $\alpha$ is the loss coefficient. The loss coefficient is an effective coefficient that might account for losses due to a variety of processes such as Rayleigh scattering, absorption, etc. The first-rate equation describes the change in Stokes beam intensity along the SRS interaction length. The first term on the right-hand side is equivalent to the amount of intensity gained by the Stokes beam due to SRS. As SRS involves both beams, this term is dependent both on $I_p$ and $I_S$. The second term is equivalent to the amount of intensity lost and is thus dependent only on $I_S$. The second rate equation describes the change in pump beam intensity; its form is similar to the former. The first term on the right-hand side of the second equation equals its counterpart from the first equation up to a multiplicative factor of $-\omega_p/\omega_S$. This factor reflects that each photon (as opposed to intensity units) lost from the pump beam due to SRS is gained by the Stokes beam.

In most cases, the experimental conditions support two simplifying assumptions: (1) photon loss along the Raman interaction length, $\Delta z$, is negligible. Mathematically, this corresponds to

$$\alpha/g_R\ll I_p,I_S$$

and (2) the change in beam intensity is linear; mathematically, this corresponds to

$$g_R\cdot \Delta z\cdot Max(I_p,I_S)\ll 1$$.

Accordingly, the SRS signal, that is, the intensity changes in pump and Stokes beams, is approximated by

$$\Delta I_S\simeq g_\mathrm{R}I_{p,0}I_{S,0}\Delta z,$$

$$\Delta I_p\simeq-\frac{\omega_p}{\omega_S}g_\mathrm{R}I_{p,0}I_{S,0}\Delta z,$$

where $I_{p,0}$ and $I_{S,0}$ are the initial pump and Stokes beams intensities, respectively. As for the Raman interaction length, in many cases, this length can be evaluated similarly to the evaluation of the Rayleigh length as

$$\Delta z=4\pi n \omega_0^2/(\lambda_p+\lambda_S)$$.

Here, $n$ and $\omega_0$ are the averaged refractive index and beam waist, respectively, and $\lambda_p$ and $\lambda_S$ are the pump and Stokes wavelengths, respectively.

Every molecule has some characteristic Raman shifts associated with a specific vibrational (or rotational) transition. The relation between a Raman shift, $\Delta\omega$, and the pump and Stokes photon wavelengths is given by

$$\Delta\omega[\mathrm{cm}^{-1}]=\left(\frac{1}{\lambda_p[\mathrm{nm}]}-\frac{1}{\lambda_S[\mathrm{nm}]}\right)\times\frac{[10^7\mathrm{nm}]}{[\mathrm{cm}]}$$

When the difference in wavelengths between both lasers is close to some Raman transition, the Raman gain coefficient $g_R$ receives values on the order of $10^{-30}[\mathrm{cm}^2/\mathrm{molecule}\cdot\mathrm{sr}]$ resulting with an efficient SRS. As this difference starts to differ from a specific Raman transition, the Raman gain coefficient's value drops, and the process becomes increasingly less efficient and less detectable.

An SRS experimental setup includes two laser beams (usually co-linear) of the same polarization; one is employed as pump and the other as Stokes. Usually, at least one of the lasers is pulsed. This modulation in the laser intensity helps to detect the signal; furthermore, it helps increase the signal's amplitude, which also helps detection. When designing the experimental setup, one has great liberty when choosing the pump and Stokes lasers, as the Raman condition (shown in the equation above) applies only to the difference in wavelengths.

== Comparison with other Raman spectroscopy variants ==
Since SRS is a resonantly enhanced process, its signal is several orders of magnitude higher than a spontaneous Raman scattering, making it a much more efficient spectroscopic tool. Furthermore, the signal intensity of SRS is also several orders of magnitude higher than another prevalent sort of spectroscopy – coherent anti-Stokes Raman spectroscopy. SRS involves only two photons, as opposed to the latter, which involves three. Thus, the occurrence of SRS is more probable and results in a higher signal. There are two additional prominent variants of spontaneous Raman spectroscopy – surface-enhanced Raman spectroscopy and resonance Raman spectroscopy. The former is designated for Raman spectroscopy of molecules adsorbed on rough surfaces such as metal surfaces or nanostructures, which magnifies the Raman signal by many orders of magnitude. The latter corresponds to a spontaneous Raman scattering process performed by a laser with a frequency close to the electronic transition of the subject in the study. This may amplify the signal. However, it requires the use of highly powerful UV or X-ray lasers that might cause photodegradation and might also induce fluorescence.

== Applications ==
SRS is employed in various applications from a wide variety of fields. All applications utilize the ability of SRS to detect a vibrational (or rotational) spectral signature of the subject in the study. Here are some examples:

=== Study of molecular conformational structures ===
Works in this field were done both in the Cina and Bar groups. Each conformer is associated with a slightly different SRS spectral signature. Detection of these different landscapes indicates the different conformational structures of the same molecule.

=== Material composition analysis ===
Here, the SRS signal dependence on the concentration of the material is utilized. Measuring different SRS signals associated with the different materials in the composition allows for the determination of the composition's stoichiometric relations.

=== Microscopy ===
Stimulated Raman scattering (SRS) microscopy allows non-invasive label-free imaging in living tissue. In this method, pioneered by the Xie group, a construction of an image is obtained by performing SRS measurements over some grid, where each measurement adds a pixel to the image. By interpreting the chemical contrast afforded by SRS measurement, it was shown that distributions of lipids and omega-3 fatty acids can be differentiated in cells. SRS microscopy has been applied in various tissue contexts to study disease and tissue function. In pathological applications, it has been deployed for label free detection and study of brain tumor, diabetic kidney disease, gastrointestinal cancer, and many other conditions.

=== Ultrafast microscopy ===
Employing femtosecond laser pulses, as was done in the Katz, Silberberg, and Xie groups, allows for an instant generation of a substantial portion of the spectral signature by a single laser pulse. The broad signal results from the width of the laser band as dictated by the uncertainty principle, which determines an inverse proportion between the uncertainty in time and frequency. This method is far faster than traditional microscopy methods as it circumvents the need for long and time-consuming frequency scanning.

== See also ==
- Nonlinear optics
- Coherent Raman scattering microscopy
