= Zurich Instruments =

Swiss measurement hardware company

- Type: Corporation
- Industry: Electronic Equipment
- Founded: 2008
- Founder: Sadik Hafizovic; Flavio Heer; Beat Hofstetter
- Headquarters: Zurich, Switzerland
- Area served: Worldwide
- Key people: Andrea Orzati (CEO); Flavio Heer (CTO); Stephan Richter (CSO); Adrian Messmer (VP HR); Youssef Hautier (COO); David Müller (VP R&D)
- Products: Lock-in Amplifiers; Quantum; Computing; Control Systems; Arbitrary Waveform Generators; Impedance Analyzers; Boxcar Averagers; Phased-locked Loops (PLL)
- Number of employees: 168
- Parent: Rohde & Schwarz (2021–present)
- Website: zhinst.com

Zurich Instruments Ltd. is a privately owned company (since 2021 owned by Rohde & Schwarz) developing and selling advanced test and measurement instruments equipped with software for dynamic signal analysis. The company is based in Technopark, Zurich, Switzerland, and has international subsidiaries operating in Shanghai and Boston. Its focus is on academic and industrial research and development organizations.

== History ==
Zurich Instruments was founded in April 2008 as a spin-off by three employees of the Swiss Federal Institute of Technology (ETH Zurich). hoping to take advantage of market demand for better lock-in amplifiers.

Seed financing was gained from startup competition prizes and a research project for ETH Zurich. Since then, Zurich Instruments' growth has been self-financed.

The company's first product, the HF2LI, a 50 MHz lock-in amplifier, was introduced in 2009. By 2015 two further lock-in amplifiers, the UHFLI and MFLI, had been introduced, covering the frequency ranges from DC to 600 MHz and DC to 500 kHz/5 MHz respectively. In 2022, two lock-in amplifiers were launched, the GHFLI and the SHFLI, enabling users to measure signals also in the microwave regions, with maximum operation frequencies of 1.8 GHz and 8.5 GHz respectively, but still starting from DC at the low end.

Since 2016 Zurich Instruments has also been developing quantum computing instrumentation technology in close collaboration with the groups of Prof. Andreas Wallraff at ETH Zurich and Prof. Leo DiCarlo at Delft University of Technology. In 2018, Zurich Instruments commercialized the first Quantum Computing Control System (QCCS), which integrates a multi-channel Arbitrary Waveform Generator (HDAWG), a Quantum Analyzer (UHFQA) and a Programmable Quantum System Controller (PQSC). A second generation of the QCCS introduced to the market throughout 2020 to 2023 extended the functionality to include direct microwave signal generation at superconducting qubit operating frequencies up to 8.5 GHz, and system scalability up to 448 channels.

Zurich Instruments products include impedance analyzers, phase-locked loops, digitizers and boxcar averagers. All products utilize the instrument control software LabOne, which provides platform-independent instrument control through a web-based user interface as well as a variety of APIs.

In June 2021, Zurich Instruments was wholly acquired by Rohde & Schwarz.

== Main applications ==
- Optics & Photonics
- Scanning Probe Microscopy
- Quantum Computing & Sensing
- Nanophysics
- Sensors & Actuators
- Engineering & Semiconductors
- Bioengineering & Med-technology
- Electrochemistry
