= Dario Polli =

Italian physicist (born 1976)

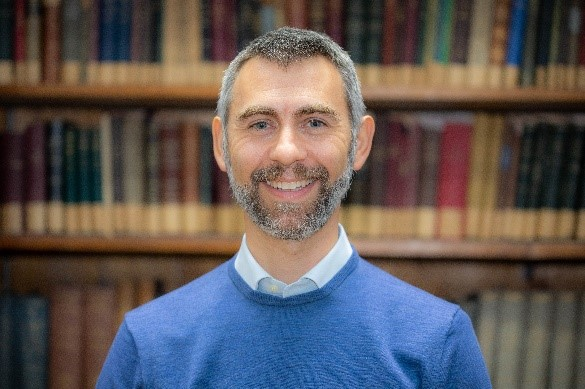
- Polli in December 2021
- Born: 5 September 1976 (age 50); Milan, Italy
- Education: Politecnico di Milano (BSc), Politecnico di Milano & École Centrale Paris (MSc - double degree program); Politecnico di Milano (PhD)
- Scientific career
- Workplaces: Politecnico di Milano
- Thesis: Generation of tunable few-optical-cycles laser pulses and their application to spectroscopy of organic molecules (2005)

Dario Polli is an Italian physicist and academic, whose research interests include the development of innovative microscopy systems, especially in the field of coherent Raman scattering microscopy, ultrafast spectroscopy, Fourier-transform spectroscopy and hyperspectral imaging. He is currently serving as a Full Professor of Physics at the Physics Department of the Politecnico di Milano. Polli is also associated with the Italian CNR (National Research Council) with a research assignment.

== Early life and education ==
Polli completed his master's degree in electronics engineering cum laude at the Politecnico di Milano. He also holds a master's degree in physical engineering from the École Centrale de Paris in France, which he obtained through the "TIME - Top Industrial Managers for Europe" project.

From 2002 to 2005, Polli pursued a Ph.D. in physics at the Physics Department of the Politecnico di Milano. After completing his Ph.D., he joined the Physics Department as an Assistant Professor and later as Full Professor.

== Career ==
Polli currently heads a research group at Politecnico di Milano dedicated to the development of innovative label-free nonlinear optical microscopy systems for biological applications, such as coherent Raman scattering microscopy, second-harmonic imaging and two-photon-excited fluorescence. His previous works focused on investigating the ultrafast dynamics of excited states in organic molecules, semiconductors, and nanomaterials.

Polli has been the principal investigator for several research grants, such as a European Research Council (ERC) consolidator grant "VIBRA", two ERC Proof-of-Concept grants, an Horizon-2020 project and a European Innovation Council (EIC) Transition project.

Outside academia, Polli founded three startups: NIREOS, Specto Photonics and SunCubes.

== Awards and honours ==
- Principal investigator of a European Research Council (ERC) consolidator grant "VIBRA" and of two ERC Proof-of-Concept grants.
- SPIE Senior Member
- Elected fellow of OPTICA in 2022 "For pioneering contributions to ultrafast spectroscopy and nonlinear label-free microscopy"
- Project coordinator of an Horizon-2020 "Disruptive Photonics Technologies" (ICT-36) project entitled "CRIMSON - Coherent Raman Imaging for the Molecular Study of the OrigiN of diseases" from 2020 to 2024.

== Selected publications ==
- Polli, D.; Altoè, P.; Weingart, O.; Spillane, K. M.; Manzoni, C.; Brida, D.; Tomasello, G.; Orlandi, G.; Kukura, P.; Mathies, R. A.; Garavelli, M.; Cerullo, G. (2010). "Conical intersection dynamics of the primary photoisomerization event in vision". Nature. 467 (7314): 440–443. Bibcode:2010Natur.467..440P. doi:10.1038/nature09346. PMID 20864998.
- Cerullo, G.; Polli, D.; Lanzani, G.; De Silvestri, S.; Hashimoto, H.; Cogdell, R.J. (2002). "Photosynthetic Light Harvesting by Carotenoids: Detection of an Intermediate Excited State". Science. 298 (5602): 2395–2398. Bibcode:2002Sci...298.2395C. doi:10.1126/science.1074685. PMID 12493917.
- Lüer, L.; Hoseinkhani, S.; Polli, D.; Crochet, J.; Hertel, T.; Lanzani, G. (2009). "Size and mobility of excitons in (6, 5) carbon nanotubes". Nature Physics. 5 (1): 54–58. Bibcode:2009NatPh...5...54L. doi:10.1038/nphys1149.
