= Coherent Raman scattering microscopy =

Multi-photon microscopy technique

Simultaneous two-color label-free stimulated Raman scattering z-stack imaging of mouse ear (red: protein, green: lipid, image is 220 by 220 microns the total depth is 60 microns, the pixel dwell time is 2 microsecond).

Coherent Raman scattering (CRS) microscopy is a multi-photon microscopy technique based on Raman-active vibrational modes of molecules. The two major techniques in CRS microscopy are stimulated Raman scattering (SRS) and coherent anti-Stokes Raman scattering (CARS). SRS and CARS were theoretically predicted and experimentally realized in the 1960s. In 1982 the first CARS microscope was demonstrated. In 1999, CARS microscopy using a collinear geometry and high numerical aperture objective were developed in Xiaoliang Sunney Xie's lab at Harvard University. This advancement made the technique more compatible with modern laser scanning microscopes. Since then, CRS's popularity in biomedical research started to grow. CRS is mainly used to image lipid, protein, and other bio-molecules in live or fixed cells or tissues without labeling or staining. CRS can also be used to image samples labeled with Raman tags, which can avoid interference from other molecules and normally allows for stronger CRS signals than would normally be obtained for common biomolecules. CRS also finds application in other fields, such as material science and environmental science.

== Background ==
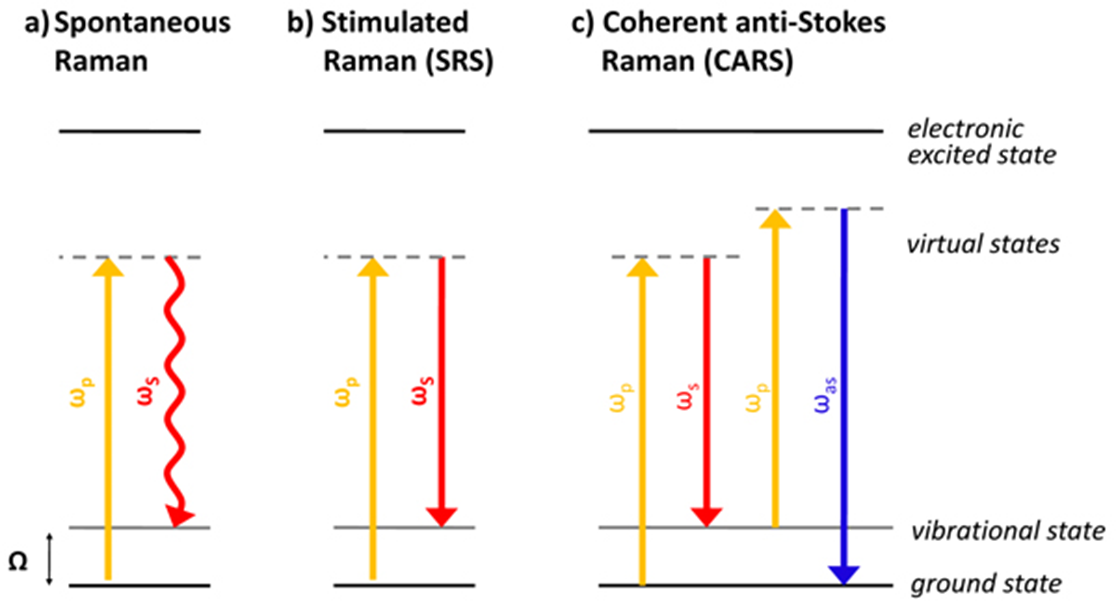
Energy diagrams of spontaneous and coherent Raman scattering processes.

Coherent Raman scattering is based on Raman scattering (or spontaneous Raman scattering). In spontaneous Raman, only one monochromatic excitation laser is used. Spontaneous Raman scattering's signal intensity grows linearly with the average power of a continuous-wave pump laser. In CRS, two lasers are used to excite specific vibrational modes of molecules to be imaged. The laser with a higher photon energy is normally called the pump laser and the laser with a lower photon energy is called Stokes laser. In order to produce a signal their photon energy differences must match the energy of a vibrational mode:

$E_{Raman}=E_{pump}-E_{Stokes}$,

where the $E_{Raman}=\hbar \Omega,\ E_{pump}= \hbar \omega_{pump},\ E_{Stokes}=\hbar \omega_{Stokes}$.

CRS is a nonlinear optical process, where the signal level is normally a function of the product of the powers of the pump and Stokes lasers. Therefore, most CRS microscopy experiments are performed with pulsed lasers, where higher peak power improved the signal levels of CRS significantly.

=== Coherent anti-Stokes Raman scattering (CARS) Microscopy ===
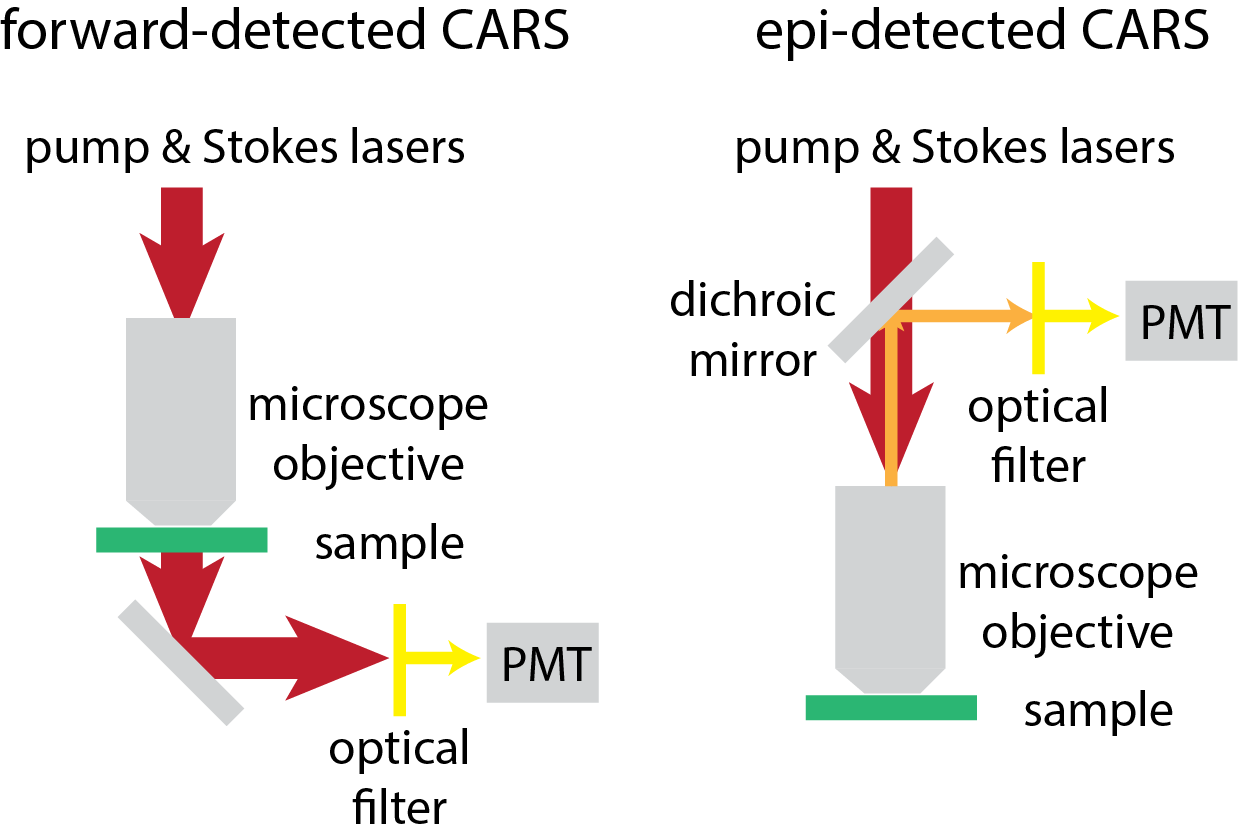
Forward and epi-detected CARS

In CARS, anti-Stokes photons (higher in energy, shorter wavelength than the pump) are detected as signals.

$E_{CARS}=E_{pump}+\Omega=2\times E_{pump}-E_{Stokes}$

In CARS microscopy, there are normally two ways to detect the newly generated photons. One is called forward-detected CARS, the other called epi-detected CARS. In forward-detected CARS, the generated CARS photons together with pump and Stokes lasers go through the sample. The pump and Stokes lasers are completely blocked by a high optical density (OD) notch filter. The CARS photons are then detected by a photomultiplier tube (PMT) or a CCD camera. In epi-detected CARS, back-scattered CARS photons are redirected by a dichroic mirror or polarizing beam splitter. After high OD filters are used to block back-scattered pump and Stokes lasers, the newly generated photons are detected by a PMT. The signal intensity of CARS has the following relationship with the pump and Stokes laser intensities $I_{pump}, I_{Stokes}$, the number of molecules $N$ in the focus of the lasers and the third order Raman susceptibility $\chi ^{(3)} _{Raman}$ of the molecule:

$I_{CARS}\propto (N \chi ^{(3)} _{Raman})^2 I^2_{pump} I_{Stokes}$

The signal-to-noise ratio (SNR), which is a more important characteristic in imaging experiments, depends on the square root of the number of CARS photons generated, which is given below:

$SNR_{CARS}\propto N \chi ^{(3)} _{Raman} I_{pump} \sqrt{I_{Stokes}}$

There are other non-linear optical processes that also generate photons at the anti-Stokes wavelength. Those signals are normally called non-resonant (NR) four-wave-mixing (FWM) background in CARS microscopy. These background can interfere with the CARS signal either constructively or destructively. However, the problem can be partially circumvented by subtracting the on- and off-resonance images or using mathematical methods to retrieve the background free images.

=== Stimulated Raman scattering (SRS) microscopy ===
In SRS, the intensity of the energy transfer from the pump wavelength to the Stokes laser wavelength is measured as a signal. There are two ways to measure SRS signals, one is to measure the increase of power in Stokes laser, which is called stimulated Raman gain (SRG). The other is to measure the decrease of power in the pump laser, which is called stimulated Raman loss (SRL). Since the change of power is on the order of 10^{−3} to 10^{−6} compared with the original power of pump and Stokes lasers, a modulation transfer scheme is normally employed to extract the SRS signals. The SRS signal depends on the pump and Stokes laser powers in the following way:

$I_{SRS}\propto N\chi^{(3)}_{Raman} I_{pump}I_{Stokes}$

Shot noise limited detection can be achieved if electronic noise from detectors are reduced well below optical noise and the lasers are shot noise limited at the detection frequency (modulation frequency). In the shot noise limited case, the signal-to-noise ratio (SNR) of SRS is

$SNR_{SRL}\propto N\chi^{(3)}_{Raman} \sqrt{I_{pump}}I_{Stokes}$

$SNR_{SRG}\propto N\chi^{(3)}_{Raman} I_{pump}\sqrt{I_{Stokes}}$

The signal of SRS is free from the non-resonant background which plagues CARS microscopy, although a much smaller non-resonant background from other optical process (e.g. cross-phase modulation, multi-color multi-photon absorption) may exist.

SRS can be detected in either the forward direction and epi directions. In forward-detected SRS, the modulated laser is blocked by a high OD notch filter and the other laser is measured by a photodiode. Modulation transferred from the modulated laser to the originally unmodulated laser is normally extracted by a lock-in amplifier from the output of photodiode. In epi-detected SRS, there are normally two methods to detect the SRS signal. One method is to detect the back-scattered light in front of the objective by a photodiode with a hole at the center. The other method is similar to the epi-detected CARS microscopy, where the back-scattered light goes through the objective and is deflected to the side of the light path, normally with the combination of a polarizing beam splitter and a quarter wave-plate. The Stokes (or pump) laser is then detected after filtering out the pump (or Stokes laser).

=== Two-color, multi-color, and hyper-spectral CRS microscopy ===
One pair of laser wavelengths only gives access to a single vibrational frequency. Imaging samples at different wavenumbers can provide a more specific and quantitative chemical mapping of the sample. This can be achieved by imaging at different wavenumbers one after another. This operation always involves some type of tuning: tuning of one of the lasers' wavelengths, tuning of a spectral filtering device, or tuning of the time delay between the pump and Stokes lasers in the case of spectral-focusing CRS. Another way of performing multi-color CRS is to use one picosecond laser with a narrow spectral bandwidth (<1 nm) as pump or Stokes and the other laser with broad spectral bandwidth. In this case, the spectrum of the transmitted broadband laser can be spread by a grating and measured by an array of detectors.

=== Spectral-focusing CRS ===
CRS normally use lasers with narrow bandwidth lasers, whose bandwidth < 1 nm, to maintain good spectral resolution ~ 15 cm^{−1}. Lasers with sub 1 nm bandwidth are picosecond lasers. In spectral-focusing CRS, femtosecond pump and Stokes lasers are equally linearly chirped into picosecond lasers. The effective bandwidth become smaller and therefore, high spectral resolution can be achieved this way with femtosecond lasers which normally have a broad bandwidth. The wavenumber tuning of spectral-focusing CRS can be achieved both by changing the center wavelength of lasers and by changing the delay between pump and Stokes lasers.

== Applications ==
=== Coherent Raman histology ===
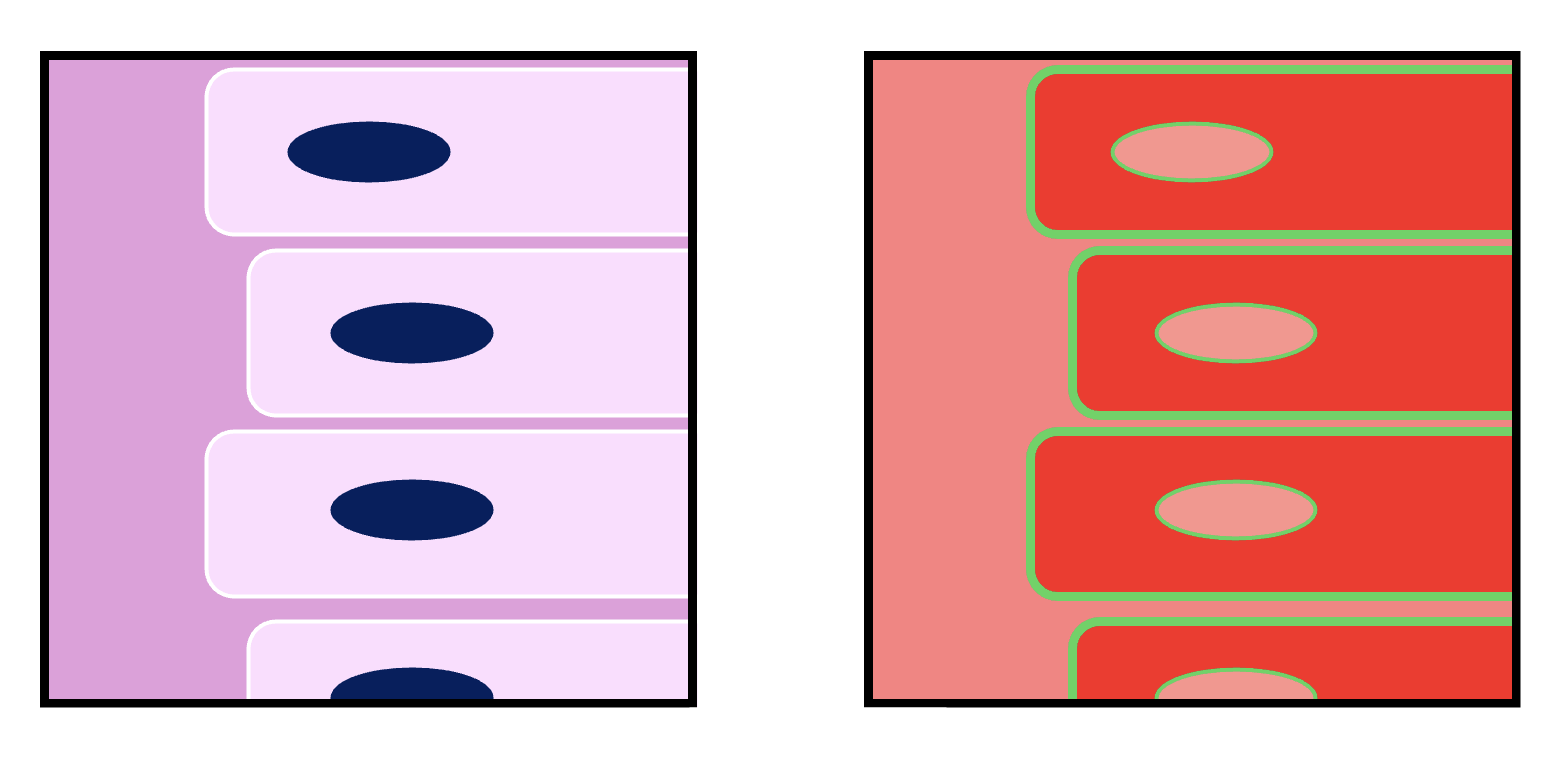
A comparison of a traditional hematoxylin and eosin stain with nucleic acids in purplish blue and extracellular matrix and cytoplasm in pink (left) and a coherent Raman histology image with protein labeled in red and lipid labeled in green (right). Specific features, like the lipid membranes, can be made clearer in CRH.

One of the major applications for CRS is label-free histology, which is also called coherent Raman histology, or sometimes stimulated Raman histology. In CRH, CRS images are obtained in tissue at vibrational frequencies characteristic of lipids and proteins. Through computational image processing, these images are merged to yield a histology-like image comparable to conventional H&E staining. Different from H&E staining, CRH can be done with little preparation time and minimal tissue destruction making it possible for live and fresh tissue without fixation or staining.

=== Cell metabolism ===
The metabolism of small molecules like glucose, cholesterol, and drugs are studied with CRS in live cells. CRS provide a way to measure molecular distribution and quantities with relatively high throughput. For example, a two-color SRS imaging method was developed that simultaneously tracked glucose uptake and incorporation in living cells with potential cancer applications.

=== Myelin imaging ===
Myelin is rich in lipid and therefore CRS images can be obtained at vibrational frequencies characteristic of lipids. CRS is routinely used to image myelin in live or fixed tissues to study neurodegenerative diseases or other neural disorders. Examples include a CRS method to study ALS and Huntington's disease.

=== Pharmaceutical research ===
The functions of drugs can be studied by CRS too. For example, an anti-leukemia drug imatinib are studied with SRS in leukemia cell lines. The study revealed the possible mechanism of its metabolism in cells and provided insight about ways to improve drug effectiveness.

=== Raman tags ===
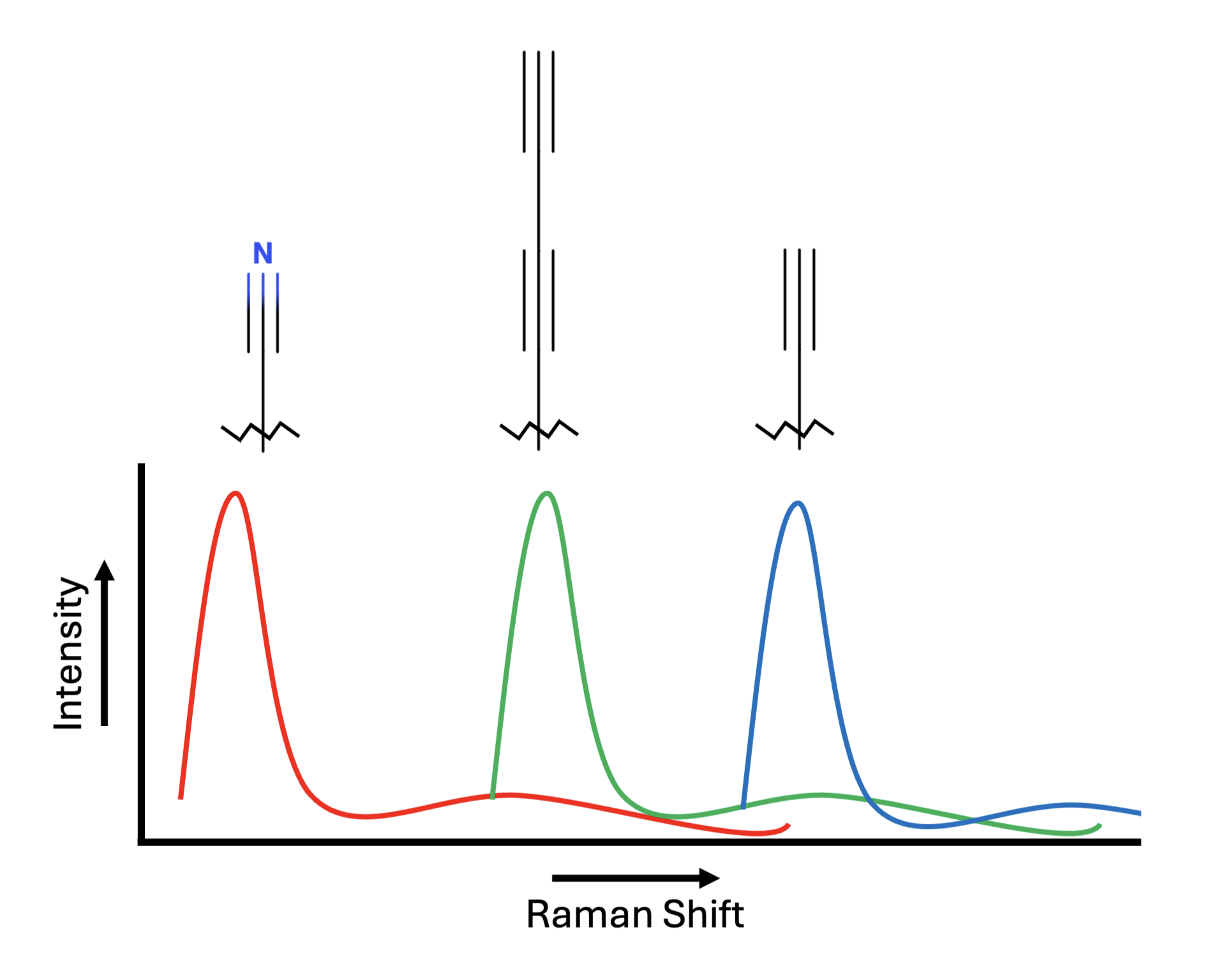
Common Raman tags (alkyne and nitrile combinations) produce different Raman spectra and can thus provide multi-color cellular images when attached to various molecules.

Even though CRS allows label-free imaging, Raman tags can also be used to boost signal for specific targets. For example, deuterated molecules are used to shift Raman signal to a band where the interference from other molecules is absent. Alkyne and nitrile functional groups are also common. Specially engineered molecules can be used as Raman tags to achieve super-multiplexing multi-color imaging with SRS.

== Comparison to confocal Raman microscopy ==
Confocal Raman microscopy normally uses continuous wave lasers to provide a spontaneous Raman spectrum over a broad wavenumber range for each point in an image. It takes a long time to scan the whole sample, since each pixel requires seconds for data acquisition. The whole imaging process is long and therefore, it is more suitable for samples that do not move. CRS on the other hand measures signals at single wavenumber but allows for fast scanning. If more spectral information is needed, multi-color or hyperspectral CRS can be used and the scanning speed or data quality will be compromised accordingly.

== Comparison between SRS and CARS ==
In CRS microscopy, we can regard SRS and CARS as two aspects of the same process. CARS signal is always mixed with non-resonant four-wave mixing background and has a quadratic dependence on concentration of chemicals being imaged. SRS has much smaller background and depends linearly on the concentration of the chemical being imaged. Therefore, SRS is more suitable for quantitative imaging than CARS. On the instrument side, SRS requires modulation and demodulation (e.g. lock-in amplifier or resonant detector). For multi-channel imaging, SRS requires multichannel demodulation while CARS only needs a PMT array or a CCD. Therefore, the instrumentation required is more complicated for SRS than CARS.

On the sensitivity side, SRS and CARS normally provide similar sensitivities. Their differences are mainly due to detection methods. In CARS microscopy, PMT, APD or CCDs are used as detectors to detect photons generated in the CARS process. PMTs are most commonly used due to their large detection area and high speed. In SRS microscopy, photodiodes are normally used to measure laser beam intensities. Because of such differences, the applications of CARS and SRS are also different.

PMTs normally have relatively low quantum efficiency compared with photodiodes. This will negatively impact the SNR of CARS microscopy. PMTs also have reduced sensitivity for lasers with wavelengths longer than 650 nm. Therefore, with the commonly used laser system for CRS (Ti-sapphire laser), CARS is mainly used to image at high wavenumber region (2800–3400 cm^{−1}). The SNR of CARS microscopy is normally poor for fingerprint imaging (400–1800 cm^{−1}).

SRS microscopy mainly uses silicon photodiode as detectors. Si photodiodes have much higher quantum efficiency than PMTs, which is one of the reasons that the SNR of SRS can be better than CARS in many cases. Si photodiodes also suffer reduced sensitivity when the wavelength of laser is longer than 850 nm. However, the sensitivity is still relatively high and allows for imaging in fingerprint region (400–1800 cm^{−1}).

== See also ==
- Coherent anti-Stokes Raman spectroscopy (CARS)
- Nonlinear optics
- Raman microscope
- Raman spectroscopy
- Scattering
- Stimulated Raman spectroscopy
