= Rotating-polarization coherent anti-Stokes Raman spectroscopy =

Rotating-polarization coherent anti-Stokes Raman spectroscopy, (RP-CARS) is a particular implementation of the coherent anti-Stokes Raman spectroscopy (CARS). RP-CARS takes advantage of polarization-dependent selection rules in order to gain information about molecule orientation anisotropy and direction within the optical point spread function.

== CARS process ==
Coherent anti-Stokes Raman spectroscopy (CARS) is a non- linear process in which the energy difference of a pair of incoming photons matches the energy of the vibrational mode of a molecular bond of interest. This phonon population is coherently probed by a third photon and anti- Stokes radiation is emitted.

== Polarization-dependent artifacts ==
In presence of molecular orientation anisotropy in the sample, CARS images often display artefacts due to polarization-dependent selection rules that affects the measured intensity with respect of the alignment between the polarization plane of the incident light and the main orientation plane of the molecular bonds. This is due because the four-wave mixing process is more efficient when the polarization plane of the incident light is aligned with the main orientation plane of the molecular vibrations.

== RP-CARS ==
RP-CARS takes advantage of the polarization-dependent selection rules to detect the local microscopic orientation of the chemical bonds under investigation. By means of RP-CARS it is possible to visualize the degree of orientation anisotropy of selected molecular bonds and to detect their average orientation direction. It is possible by continuously rotating the orientation of the polarization plane of the incident light with a rotating waveplate and then, sequentially, for each image pixel, analysing the orientation dependence of the CARS signal intensity. This allows measuring for each pixel the average-orientation plane of the molecular bonds of interest and the degree of this spatial anisotropy in the point-spread-function volume.

== Applications ==
Possible biomedical-oriented applications of this technique are related to the study of the myelin and myelopathies. Myelin is a highly ordered structure, in which many lipid- enriched, densely compacted phospholipid bilayers are spirally rolled up around the cylindrical axons. The linear acyl chains of the phospholipid molecules present a perpendicular orientation with respect to the myelin surface. Therefore, in a myelinated nerve fiber, a large number of molecular bonds are ordered around a radial axis of symmetry. Such a strong molecular anisotropy and azimuthal symmetry make RP-CARS a suitable tool to investigate neural white matter.

== See also ==
- Coherent anti-Stokes Raman spectroscopy
- Four-wave mixing
