= Xiaoliang Sunney Xie =

Chinese-American biochemist

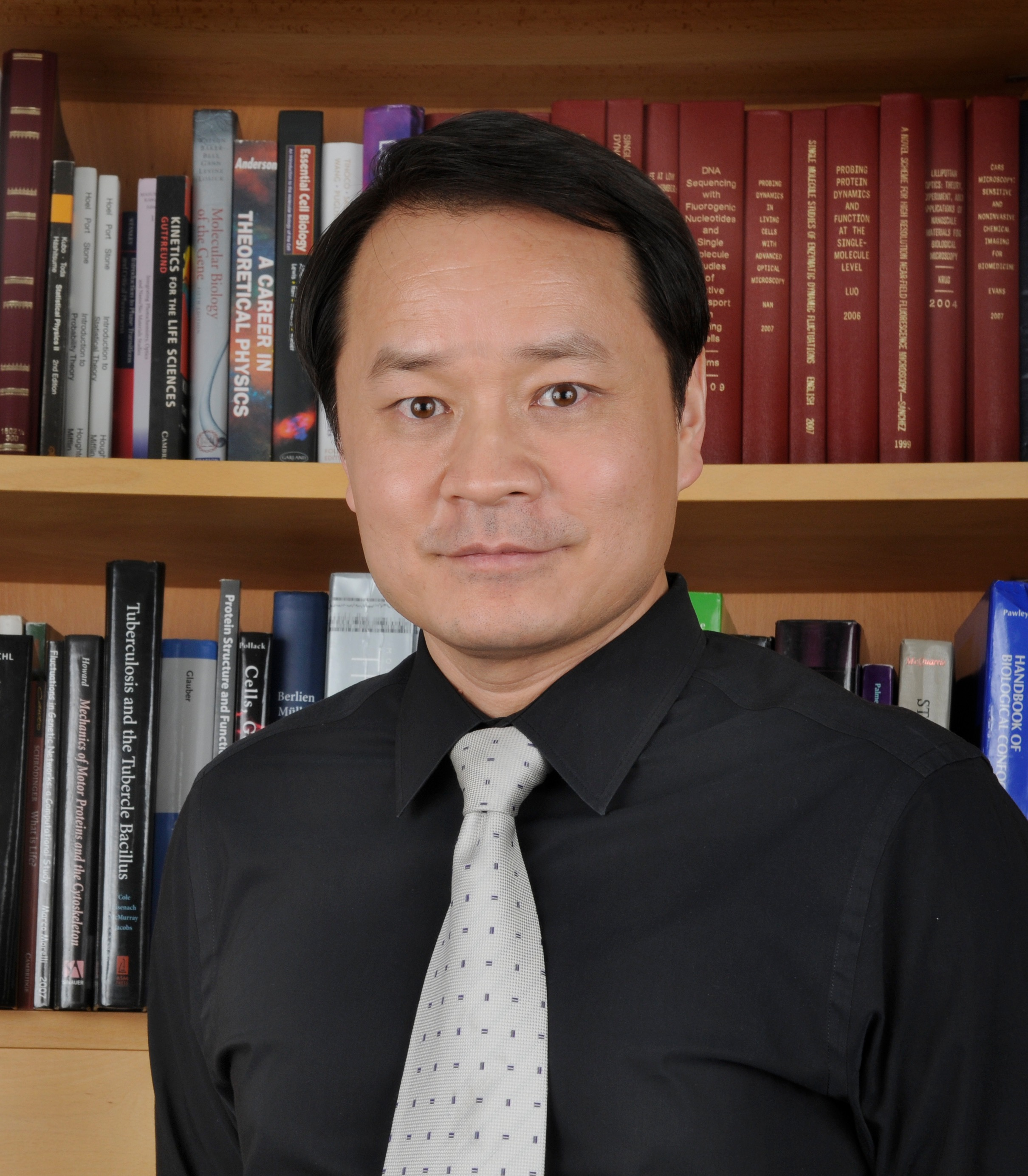
- Born: 24 June 1962 (age 64); Beijing, China
- Education: BSc in chemistry from Peking University; PhD in Physical Chemistry from UC San Diego
- Known for: Single Molecule Enzymology, Coherent Raman Imaging, Single Cell Genomics
- Awards: Albany Prize in Medicine and Biomedical Research 2015, Peter Debye Award in Physical Chemistry 2015, Ellis R. Lippincott Award 2013, Biophysical Society Founders Award 2012; NAS 2011; NAM 2016; CAS 2017
- Scientific career
- Fields: Biophysical Chemistry, Optical Imaging, Genomics
- Institutions: Harvard University; Peking University
- Doctoral advisor: John Douglas Simon
- Notable students: Will Greenleaf, Wei Min, Yunlong Cao

Xiaoliang Sunney Xie (Chinese: 谢晓亮; pinyin: Xiè Xiǎoliàng; born 24 June 1962) is a Chinese biophysicist well known for his contributions to the fields of single-molecule biophysical chemistry, coherent Raman Imaging and single-molecule genomics. He is the Director of Changping Laboratory, a newly established national scientific research institution in Beijing focused on life sciences innovation. He also serves as Lee Shau-kee Professor and Head of the Faculty of Sciences at Peking University.

In 2023, Xie renounced his U.S. citizenship in order to reclaim his Chinese citizenship.

== Early life ==
Xie was born in Beijing in 1962 with ancestral roots in Hepu County, Guangxi. He received his B.Sc. in chemistry from Peking University in 1984, and his Ph.D. in physical chemistry in 1990 from University of California at San Diego. After a brief postdoctoral appointment at University of Chicago, he joined Pacific Northwest National Laboratory, where he rose from senior research scientist to chief scientist. In 1998, he became the first tenured professor recruited by Harvard University among Chinese scholars who came to the United States since the reform and opening up.

== Research ==
He had been the Mallinckrodt Professor of Chemistry and Chemical Biology at Harvard University until 2018, when he became the Lee Shau-kee Professor of Peking University. He was the Director of Biomedical Pioneering Innovation Center (BIOPIC) in 2010–2021, and the Director of Beijing Advanced Innovation Center for Genomics (ICG) in 2016–2021, both at Peking University.

As a pioneer of single-molecule biophysical chemistry, Coherent Raman scattering microscopy, and single-cell genomics, he made major contributions to the emergence of these fields. Furthermore, he has made significant advances on medical applications of label-free optical imaging and single-cell genomics. In particular, his inventions in single-cell genomics have been used in in vitro fertilization benefited tens of thousands of families by avoiding the transmission of monogenic diseases to their newborns. During the COVID-19 pandemic, Sunney quickly responded to this public health crisis by applying high-throughput single cell sequencing to identify highly potent neutralizing antibodies. His team developed a broad-spectrum antibody drug against all existent SARS-CoV-2 variants, which has saved many lives in China.

More than fifty of his students and post-doctorates have become professors at major universities around the world, and two are co-founders of start-up companies. Professor Xie's current research interests include the following scientific, technological, and medical areas:

- Scientific: Single-molecule enzymology, Single-molecule biophysical chemistry, Gene expression and regulation, Epigenetics, Mechanism of cell differentiation and reprogramming, Chromosome structure and dynamics, and Genomic instability;
- Technological: Single-molecule imaging, Single-cell genomics, Coherent Raman scattering microscopy, DNA sequencing;
- Medical: Preimplantation genetic testing in in vitro fertilization, COVID19 vaccine and neutralizing antibody drugs for SARS-CoV-2 variants and Early cancer diagnosis.

== Honors and awards ==
- 2024: Tengchong Science Award
- 2021: Zhongguancun Outstanding Contribution Prize
- 2018: Asian Scientist 100, Asian Scientist
- 2017: Qiu Shi Outstanding Scientist Award, Qiu Shi Science & Technologies Foundation
- 2017: Foreign member of the Chinese Academy of Sciences (As of 2023, member of the CAS after Chinese citizenship reclaimed)
- 2016: Member of the National Academy of Medicine
- 2015: Albany Medical Center Prize
- 2015: Peter Debye Award in Physical Chemistry, American Chemical Society
- 2014: Fellow of the Optical Society of America
- 2013: NIH Director's Pioneer Award
- 2013: Ellis R. Lippincott Award, Optical Society of America and Society for Applied Spectroscopy
- 2012: Edward Mack Jr. Lecture, OSU
- 2012: Harrison Howe Award, Rochester Section of the American Chemical Society
- 2012: Fellow of the American Academy of Microbiology
- 2012: Biophysical Society Founders Award
- 2011: Member of the National Academy of Sciences
- 2009: Ernest Orlando Lawrence Award
- 2008: Fellow of the American Physical Society
- 2008: Berthold Leibinger Zukunftspreis for Applied Laser Technology
- 2008: Fellow of the American Academy of Arts and Sciences
- 2007: Willis E. Lamb Award for Laser Sciences and Quantum Optics
- 2006: Fellow of Biophysical Society
- 2006: Fellow of the American Association for the Advancement of Science
- 2004: NIH Director's Pioneer Award
- 2003: Raymond and Beverly Sackler Prize in the Physical Sciences
- 1996: Coblentz Award

== Selected Literature ==
=== COVID-19 Research ===
- Du, Shuo; Liu, Pulan; Zhang, Zhiying; Xiao, Tianhe; Yasimayi, Ayijiang; Huang, Weijin; Wang, Youchun; Cao, Yunlong; Xie, Xiaoliang Sunney; Xiao, Junyu (25 August 2021). "Structures of SARS-CoV-2 B.1.351 neutralizing antibodies provide insights into cocktail design against concerning variants". Cell Research. 31 (10). Springer Science and Business Media LLC: 1130–1133. doi:10.1038/s41422-021-00555-0. ISSN 1001-0602. PMC 8385480. PMID 34433900.
- Cao, Yunlong; Wang, Jing; Jian, Fanchong; Xiao, Tianhe; Song, Weiliang; Yisimayi, Ayijiang; Huang, Weijin; Li, Qianqian; Wang, Peng; An, Ran; Wang, Jing; Wang, Yao; Niu, Xiao; Yang, Sijie; Liang, Hui; Sun, Haiyan; Li, Tao; Yu, Yuanling; Cui, Qianqian; Liu, Shuo; Yang, Xiaodong; Du, Shuo; Zhang, Zhiying; Hao, Xiaohua; Shao, Fei; Jin, Ronghua; Wang, Xiangxi; Xiao, Junyu; Wang, Youchun; Xie, Xiaoliang Sunney (23 December 2021). "Omicron escapes the majority of existing SARS-CoV-2 neutralizing antibodies". Nature. 602 (7898). Springer Science and Business Media LLC: 657–663. doi:10.1038/s41586-021-04385-3. ISSN 0028-0836. PMC 8866119. PMID 35016194.
- Cao, Yunlong; Yisimayi, Ayijiang; Bai, Yali; Huang, Weijin; Li, Xiaofeng; Zhang, Zhiying; Yuan, Tianjiao; An, Ran; Wang, Jing; Xiao, Tianhe; Du, Shuo; Ma, Wenping; Song, Liyang; Li, Yongzheng; Li, Xiang; Song, Weiliang; Wu, Jiajing; Liu, Shuo; Li, Xuemei; Zhang, Yonghong; Su, Bin; Guo, Xianghua; Wei, Yangyang; Gao, Chuanping; Zhang, Nana; Zhang, Yifei; Dou, Yang; Xu, Xiaoyu; Shi, Rui; Lu, Bai; Jin, Ronghua; Ma, Yingmin; Qin, Chengfeng; Wang, Youchun; Feng, Yingmei; Xiao, Junyu; Xie, Xiaoliang Sunney (21 May 2021). "Humoral immune response to circulating SARS-CoV-2 variants elicited by inactivated and RBD-subunit vaccines". Cell Research. 31 (7). Springer Science and Business Media LLC: 732–741. doi:10.1038/s41422-021-00514-9. ISSN 1001-0602. PMC 8138844. PMID 34021265.
- Du, Shuo; Cao, Yunlong; Zhu, Qinyu; Yu, Pin; Qi, Feifei; Wang, Guopeng; Du, Xiaoxia; Bao, Linlin; Deng, Wei; Zhu, Hua; Liu, Jiangning; Nie, Jianhui; Zheng, Yinghui; Liang, Haoyu; Liu, Ruixue; Gong, Shuran; Xu, Hua; Yisimayi, Ayijiang; Lv, Qi; Wang, Bo; He, Runsheng; Han, Yunlin; Zhao, Wenjie; Bai, Yali; Qu, Yajin; Gao, Xiang; Ji, Chenggong; Wang, Qisheng; Gao, Ning; Huang, Weijin; Wang, Youchun; Xie, X. Sunney; Su, Xiao-dong; Xiao, Junyu; Qin, Chuan (2020). "Structurally Resolved SARS-CoV-2 Antibody Shows High Efficacy in Severely Infected Hamsters and Provides a Potent Cocktail Pairing Strategy". Cell. 183 (4). Elsevier BV: 1013–1023.e13. doi:10.1016/j.cell.2020.09.035. ISSN 0092-8674. PMC 7489885. PMID 32970990.
- Cao, Yunlong; Su, Bin; Guo, Xianghua; Sun, Wenjie; Deng, Yongqiang; Bao, Linlin; Zhu, Qinyu; Zhang, Xu; Zheng, Yinghui; Geng, Chenyang; Chai, Xiaoran; He, Runsheng; Li, Xiaofeng; Lv, Qi; Zhu, Hua; Deng, Wei; Xu, Yanfeng; Wang, Yanjun; Qiao, Luxin; Tan, Yafang; Song, Liyang; Wang, Guopeng; Du, Xiaoxia; Gao, Ning; Liu, Jiangning; Xiao, Junyu; Su, Xiao-dong; Du, Zongmin; Feng, Yingmei; Qin, Chuan; Qin, Chengfeng; Jin, Ronghua; Xie, X. Sunney (2020). "Potent Neutralizing Antibodies against SARS-CoV-2 Identified by High-Throughput Single-Cell Sequencing of Convalescent Patients' B Cells". Cell. 182 (1). Elsevier BV: 73–84.e16. doi:10.1016/j.cell.2020.05.025. ISSN 0092-8674. PMC 7231725. PMID 32425270.

=== Single-Cell Genomics ===
- He, Runsheng; Dong, Wenyang; Wang, Zhi; Xie, Chen; Gao, Long; Ma, Wenping; Shen, Ke; Li, Dubai; Pang, Yuxuan; Jian, Fanchong; Zhang, Jiankun; Yuan, Yuan; Wang, Xinyao; Zhang, Zhen; Zheng, Yinhui; Liu, Shuang; Luo, Cheng; Chai, Xiaoran; Ren, Jun; Zhu, Zhanxin; Xie, X. Sunney (2024). "Genome-wide single-cell and single-molecule footprinting of transcription factors with deaminase". Proc Natl Acad Sci USA. 121 (52): e2423270121. doi: 10.1073/pnas.2423270121. PMC11670102. PMID 39689177
- Tan, Longzhi; Xie, X. Sunney (2018). "A Near-complete Spatial Map of Olfactory Receptors in the Mouse Main Olfactory Epithelium". Chem Senses. 43 (6): 427–432. doi:10.1093/chemse/bjy030. PMC 6454507. PMID 29796642.
- Xu, Juanjuan; Fang, Rui; Chen, Li; Chen, Daozhen; Xiao, Jian-Ping; Yang, Weimin; Wang, Honghua; Song, Xiaoqing; Ma, Ting; Bo, Shiping; Shi, Chong; Ren, Jun; Huang, Lei; Cai, Li-Yi; Yao, Bing; Xie, X Sunney; Lu, Sijia (2016). "Noninvasive chromosome screening of human embryos by genome sequencing of embryo culture medium for in vitro fertilization". Proc Natl Acad Sci USA. 113 (42): 11907–1. Bibcode:2016PNAS..11311907X. doi:10.1073/pnas.1613294113. PMC 5081593. PMID 27688762.
- Chen, Chongyi; Xing, Dong; Tan, Longzhi; Li, Heng; Zhou, Guangyu; Huang, Lei; Xie, X. Sunney (2017). "Single-cell whole-genome analyses by Linear Amplification via Transposon Insertion (LIANTI)". Science. 356 (6334): 189–194. Bibcode:2017Sci...356..189C. doi:10.1126/science.aak9787. PMC 5538131. PMID 28408603.
- Yan, Liying; Huang, Lei; Xu, Liya; Huang, Jin; Ma, Fei; Zhu, Xiaohui; Tang, Yaqiong; Liu, Mingshan; Lian, Ying; Liu, Ping; Li, Rong; Lu, Sijia; Tang, Fuchou; Qiao, Jie; Xie, X Sunney (2015). "Live births after simultaneous avoidance of monogenic diseases and chromosome abnormality by next-generation sequencing with linkage analyses". Proc Natl Acad Sci USA. 112 (52): 15964–15969. Bibcode:2015PNAS..11215964Y. doi:10.1073/pnas.1523297113. PMC 4702982. PMID 26712022.
- Hou, Yu; Fan, Wei; Yan, Liying; Li, Rong; Lian, Ying; Huang, Jin; Li, Jinsen; Xu, Liya; Tang, Fuchou; Xie, X. Sunney; Qiao, Jie (2013). "Genome Analyses of Single Human Oocytes". Cell. 155 (7): 1492–1506. doi:10.1016/j.cell.2013.11.040. PMID 24360273.
- Zong, Chenghang; Lu, Sijia; Chapman, Alec R.; Xie, X. Sunney (2012). "Genome-Wide Detection of Single-Nucleotide and Copy-Number Variations of a Single Human Cell". Science. 338 (6114): 1622–1626. Bibcode:2012Sci...338.1622Z. doi:10.1126/science.1229164. PMC 3600412. PMID 23258894.

=== Gene Expression and Regulation ===
- Chong, Shasha; Chen, Chongyi; Ge, Hao; Sunney, Xie X. (2014). "Mechanism of Transcriptional Bursting in Bacteria". Cell. 158 (2): 314–326. doi:10.1016/j.cell.2014.05.038. PMC 4105854. PMID 25036631.
- Taniguchi, Yuichi; Choi, Paul J.; Li, Gene-Wei; Chen, Huiyi; Babu, Mohan; Hearn, Jeremy; Emili, Andrew; Xie, X. Sunney (2010). "Quantifying E. coli Proteome and Transcriptome with Single-Molecule Sensitivity in Single Cells". Science. 329 (5991): 533–538. Bibcode:2010Sci...329..533T. doi:10.1126/science.1188308. PMC 2922915. PMID 20671182.
- Choi, Paul J.; Cai, Long; Frieda, Kirsten; Xie, X. Sunney (2008). "A Stochastic Single-Molecule Event Triggers Phenotype Switching of a Bacterial Cell". Science. 322 (5900): 442–446. Bibcode:2008Sci...322..442C. doi:10.1126/science.1161427. PMC 2819113. PMID 18927393.
- Elf, Johan; Li, Gene-Wei; Xie, X. Sunney (2007). "Probing Transcription Factor Dynamics at the Single-Molecule Level in a Living Cell". Science. 316 (5828): 1191–1194. Bibcode:2007Sci...316.1191E. doi:10.1126/science.1141967. PMC 2853898. PMID 17525339.
- Yu, Ji; Xiao, Jie; Ren, Xiaojia; Lao, Kaiqin; Xie, X. Sunney (2006). "Probing Gene Expression in Live Cells, One Protein Molecule at a Time". Science. 311 (5767): 1600–1603. Bibcode:2006Sci...311.1600Y. doi:10.1126/science.1119623. PMID 16543458. S2CID 14506807.
- Cai, Long; Friedman, Nir; Xie, X. Sunney (2006). "Stochastic Protein Expression in Individual Cells at the Single Molecule Level". Nature. 440 (7082): 358–362. Bibcode:2006Natur.440..358C. doi:10.1038/nature04599. PMID 16541077. S2CID 4426109.

=== Single Molecule Enzymology ===
- Chong, Shasha; Chen, Chongyi; Ge, Hao; Sunney, Xie X. (2014). "Mechanism of Transcriptional Bursting in Bacteria". Cell. 158 (2): 314–326. doi:10.1016/j.cell.2014.05.038. PMC 4105854. PMID 25036631.
- Kim, Sangjin; Broströmer, Erik; Xing, Dong; Jin, Jianshi; Chong, Shasha; Ge, Hao; Wang, Siyuan; Gu, Chan; Yang, Lijiang; Gao, Yiqin; Su, Xiao-dong; Sun, Yujie; Xie, X. Sunney (2013). "Probing Allostery Through DNA". Science. 339 (6121): 816–819. Bibcode:2013Sci...339..816K. doi:10.1126/science.1229223. PMC 3586787. PMID 23413354.
- English, Brian P.; Min, Wei; van Oijen, Antoine M.; Lee, Kang Taek; Luo, Guobin; Sun, Hongye; Cherayil, Binny J.; Kou, S.C.; Xie, X. Sunney (2006). "Ever-Fluctuating Single Enzyme Molecules: Michaelis-Menten Equation Revisited". Nat Chem Biol. 2 (2): 87–94. doi:10.1038/nchembio759. PMID 16415859. S2CID 2201882.
- Yang, Haw; Luo, Guobin; Karnchanaphanurach, Pallop; Louie, Tai-Man; Rech, Ivan; Cova, Sergio; Xun, Luying; Xie, X. Sunney (2003). "Protein Conformational Dynamics Probed by Single-Molecule Electron Transfer". Science. 302 (5643): 262–266. Bibcode:2003Sci...302..262Y. doi:10.1126/science.1086911. PMID 14551431. S2CID 18706150.
- Lu, H. Peter; Xun, Luying; Xie, X. Sunney (1998). "Single-Molecule Enzymatic Dynamics". Science. 282 (5395): 1877–1882. Bibcode:1998Sci...282.1877P. doi:10.1126/science.282.5395.1877. PMID 9836635.

=== Coherent Raman Imaging ===
- Ji, Minbiao; Orringer, Daniel A.; Freudiger, Christian W.; Ramkissoon, Shakti; Liu, Xiaohui; Lau, Darryl; Golby, Alexandra J.; Norton, Isaiah; Hayashi, Marika; Agar, Nathalie Y. R.; Young, Geoffrey S.; Spino, Cathie; Santagata, Sandro; Camelo-Piragua, Sandra; Ligon, Keith L.; Sagher, Oren; Xie, X. Sunney (2013). "Rapid, Label-Free Detection of Brain Tumors with Stimulated Raman Scattering Microscopy". Science Translational Medicine. 5 (201): 201. doi:10.1126/scitranslmed.3005954. PMC 3806096. PMID 24005159.
- Wang, Meng C.; Min, Wei; Freudiger, Christian W.; Ruvkun, Gary; Xie, X. Sunney (2011). "RNAi Screening for Fat Regulatory Genes with SRS Microscopy". Nat Methods. 8 (2): 135–138. doi:10.1038/nmeth.1556. PMC 3061290. PMID 21240281.
- Saar, Brian G.; Freudiger, Christian W.; Reichman, Jay; Stanley, C. Michael; Holtom, Gary R.; Xie, X. Sunney (2010). "Video-Rate Molecular Imaging in Vivo with Stimulated Raman Scattering". Science. 330 (6009): 1368–1370. Bibcode:2010Sci...330.1368S. doi:10.1126/science.1197236. PMC 3462359. PMID 21127249.
- Freudiger, Christian W.; Min, Wei; Saar, Brian G.; Lu, Sijia; Holtom, Gary R.; He, Chengwei; Tsai, Jason C.; Kang, Jing X.; Xie, X. Sunney (2008). "Label-Free Biomedical Imaging with High sensitivity by Stimulated Raman Scattering Microscopy". Science. 322 (5909): 1857–1860. Bibcode:2008Sci...322.1857F. doi:10.1126/science.1165758. PMC 3576036. PMID 19095943.
- Evans, Conor L.; Potma, Eric O.; Puoris'Haag, Mehron; Côté, Daniel; Lin, Charles P.; Xie, X. Sunney (2005). "Chemical imaging of tissue in vivo with video-rate coherent anti-Stokes Raman scattering microscopy". Proc. Natl. Acad. Sci. 102 (46): 16807–16812. Bibcode:2005PNAS..10216807E. doi:10.1073/pnas.0508282102. PMC 1283840. PMID 16263923.
- Zumbusch, Andreas; Holtom, Gary R.; Xie, X. Sunney (1999). "Vibrational Microscopy Using Coherent Anti-Stokes Raman Scattering". Phys Rev Lett. 82 (20): 4142–4145. Bibcode:1999PhRvL..82.4142Z. doi:10.1103/physrevlett.82.4142.

=== Single Molecule Imaging ===
- Zhou, Yuexin; Wang, Ping; Tian, Feng; Gao, Ge; Huang, Lei; Wei, Wensheng; Xie, X. Sunney (2017). "Painting a specific chromosome with CRISPR/Cas9 for live-cell imaging". Cell Res. 27 (2): 298–301. doi:10.1038/cr.2017.9. PMC 5339855. PMID 28084328.
- Chong, Shasha; Min, Wei; Xie, X. Sunney (2010). "Ground-State Depletion Microscopy:Detection Sensitivity of Single-Molecule Optical Absorption at Room Temperature". J Phys Chem Lett. 1 (23): 3316–3322. doi:10.1021/jz1014289. S2CID 1244482.
- Min, Wei; Lu, Sijia; Chong, Shasha; Roy, Rahul; Holtom, Gary R.; Xie, X. Sunney (2009). "Imaging Chromophores with Undetectable Fluorescence by Stimulated Emission Microscopy". Nature. 461 (7267): 1105–1109. Bibcode:2009Natur.461.1105M. doi:10.1038/nature08438. PMID 19847261. S2CID 1460208.
- Sánchez, Erik J.; Novotny, Lukas; Xie, X. Sunney (1999). "Near-field Fluorescence Microscopy Based on Two-photon Excitation with Metal Tips". Phys Rev Lett. 82 (20): 4014–4017. Bibcode:1999PhRvL..82.4014S. doi:10.1103/physrevlett.82.4014.
- Sánchez, Erik J.; Novotny, Lukas; Holtom, G.R.; Xie, X. Sunney (1997). "Room-Temperature Fluorescence Imaging and Spectroscopy of Single Molecules by Two-Photon Excitation". J Phys Chem A. 101 (38): 7019–7023. Bibcode:1997JPCA..101.7019S. doi:10.1021/jp971915b.
- Xie, X. Sunney; Dunn, Robert C. (1994). "Probing Single Molecule Dynamics". Science. 265 (5170): 361–364. Bibcode:1994Sci...265..361X. doi:10.1126/science.265.5170.361. PMID 17838036. S2CID 6161198.

== See also ==
- Cho Minhaeng
