= Impedance analyzer =

Type of electronic test equipment

An impedance analyzer is a type of electronic test equipment used to measure complex electrical impedance as a function of test frequency.

Impedance is an important parameter used to characterize electronic components, electronic circuits, and the materials used to make components. Impedance analysis can also be used to characterize materials exhibiting dielectric behavior such as biological tissue, foodstuffs or geological samples.

Impedance analyzers come in three distinct hardware implementations, and together these three implementations can probe from ultra low frequency to ultra high frequency and can measure impedances from μΩ to TΩ.

== Operation ==
Impedance analyzers are a class of instruments which measure complex electrical impedance as a function of frequency. This involves the phase sensitive measurement of current and voltage applied to a device under test while the measurement frequency is varied over the course of the measurement. Key specifications of an impedance analyzer are the frequency range, impedance range, absolute impedance accuracy and phase angle accuracy. Further specifications include the ability to apply voltage bias and current bias while measuring, and the measurement speed.

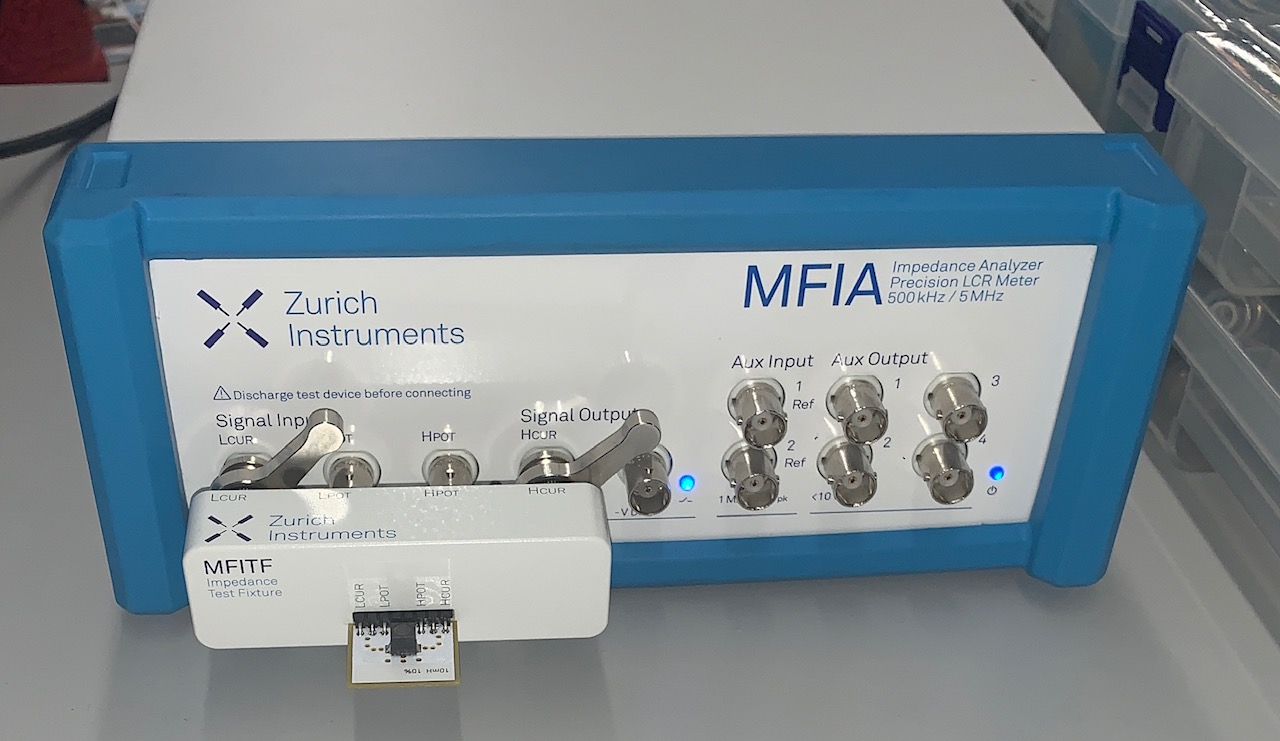
Computer controlled impedance analyzer based on the direct I-V mode with test fixture attached.

Impedance analyzers typically offer highly accurate impedance measurements, e.g. with a basic accuracy of up to 0.05%, and a frequency measurement range from μHz to GHz. Impedance values can range over many decades from μΩ to TΩ, whereas the phase angle accuracy is in the range of 10 millidegree. Measured impedance values include absolute impedance, the real and imaginary part of the measured impedance and the phase between the voltage and current. Model-derived impedance parameters such as conductance, inductance and capacitance are calculated based on a replacement circuit model and subsequently displayed.

LCR meters also provide impedance measurement functionality, typically with similar accuracy but lower frequency range. The measurement frequency of LCR meters is generally fixed rather than swept, and cannot be displayed graphically.

Impedance analyzers have three distinct hardware implementations:
| Method | Frequency range | Impedance range | Basic accuracy |
|---|---|---|---|
| Direct I-V (Direct current-voltage) | μHz to 50 MHz | 10 μΩ to 100 TΩ | 0.05% |
| ABB (Auto-balanced bridge) | 20 Hz to 120 MHz | 10 mΩ to 100 MΩ | 0.05% |
| RF-IV (Radio frequency current-voltage) | 1 MHz to 3 GHz | 100 mΩ to 100 kΩ | 1% |

A fourth implementation, the vector network analyzer (VNA), can be considered a distinct instrument. In contrast to impedance analyzers, VNAs also measure impedance but usually at much higher frequencies and with much lower accuracy compared to impedance analyzers.

== Reactance chart ==
Most impedance analyzers come with a reactance chart which shows the reactance values for capacitive reactance X_{C} and inductive reactance X_{L} for a given frequency. The accuracy of the instrument is transposed on the chart to allow the user to quickly see what accuracy they can expect for a given frequency and reactance.

== See also ==
- Electrical impedance
- LCR meter
- VNA
