= Coherent anti-Stokes Raman spectroscopy =

Spectroscopy used in chemistry and physics

Coherent anti-Stokes Raman spectroscopy, also called Coherent anti-Stokes Raman scattering spectroscopy (CARS), is a form of spectroscopy used primarily in chemistry, physics and related fields. It is sensitive to the same vibrational signatures of molecules as seen in Raman spectroscopy, typically the nuclear vibrations of chemical bonds. Unlike Raman spectroscopy, CARS employs multiple photons to address the molecular vibrations, and produces a coherent signal. As a result, CARS is orders of magnitude stronger than spontaneous Raman emission. CARS is a third-order nonlinear optical process involving three laser beams: a pump beam of frequency ω_{p}, a Stokes beam of frequency ω_{S} and a probe beam at frequency ω_{pr}. These beams interact with the sample and generate a coherent optical signal at the anti-Stokes frequency (ω_{pr}+ω_{p}-ω_{S}). The latter is resonantly enhanced when the frequency difference between the pump and the Stokes beams (ω_{p}-ω_{S}) coincides with the frequency of a Raman resonance, which is the basis of the technique's intrinsic vibrational contrast mechanism.

Coherent Stokes Raman spectroscopy (CSRS pronounced as "scissors") is closely related to Raman spectroscopy and lasing processes. It is very similar to CARS except it uses an anti-Stokes frequency stimulation beam and a Stokes frequency beam is observed (the opposite of CARS).

== History ==
In 1965, a paper was published by two researchers of the Scientific Laboratory at the Ford Motor Company, P. D. Maker and R. W. Terhune, in which the CARS phenomenon was reported for the first time. Maker and Terhune used a pulsed ruby laser to investigate the third order response of several materials. They first passed the ruby beam of frequency ω through a Raman shifter to create a second beam at ω-ω_{v}, and then directed the two beams simultaneously onto the sample. When the pulses from both beams overlapped in space and time, the Ford researchers observed a signal at ω+ω_{v}, which is the blue-shifted CARS signal. They also demonstrated that the signal increases significantly when the difference frequency ω_{v} between the incident beams matches a Raman frequency of the sample. Maker and Terhune called their technique simply 'three wave mixing experiments'. The name coherent anti-Stokes Raman spectroscopy was assigned almost ten years later, by Begley et al. at Stanford University in 1974. Since then, this vibrationally sensitive nonlinear optical technique has been commonly known as CARS.

== Principle ==
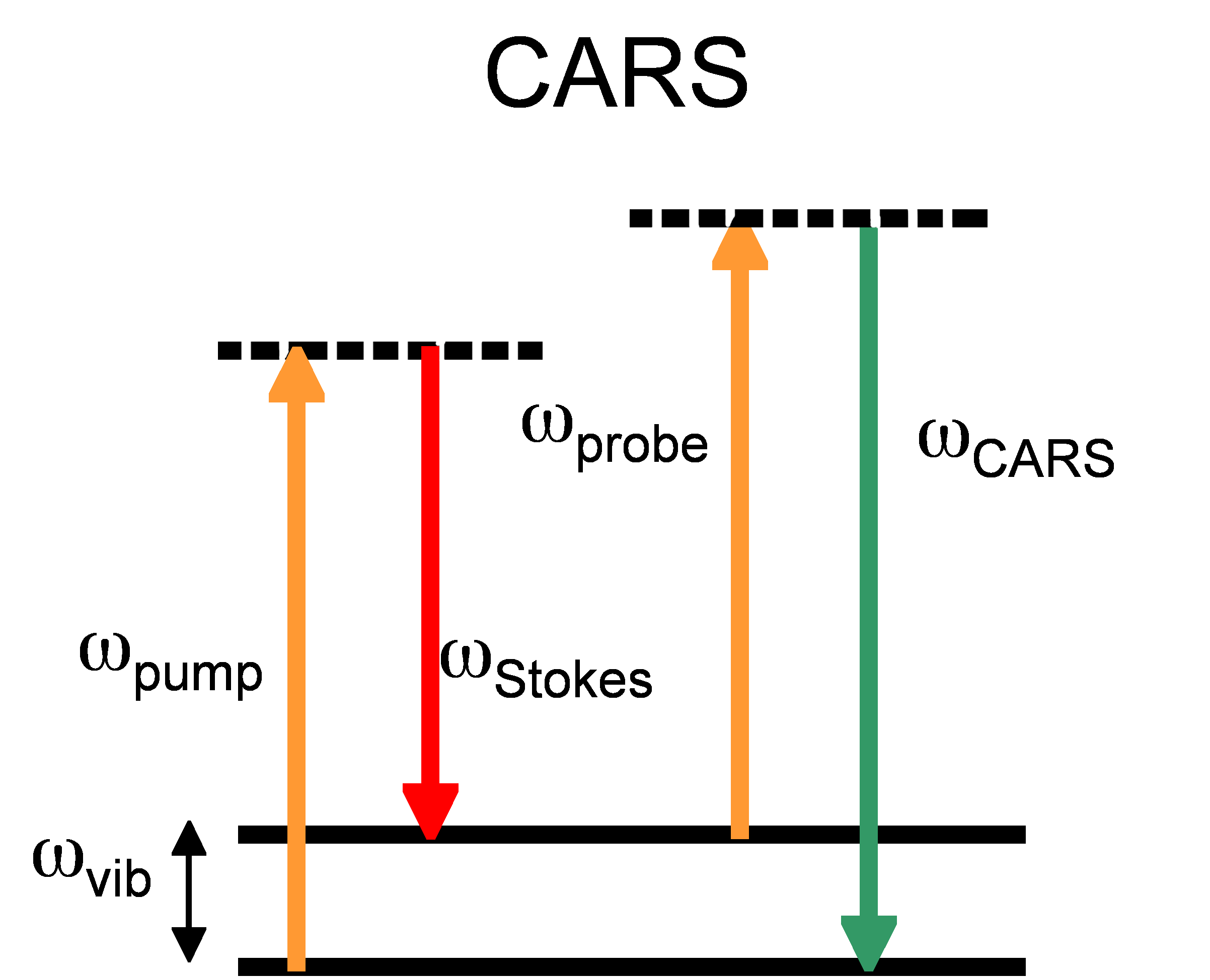
CARS energy diagram

The CARS process can be physically explained by using either a classical oscillator model or by using a quantum mechanical model that incorporates the energy levels of the molecule. Classically, the Raman active vibrator is modeled as a (damped) harmonic oscillator with a characteristic frequency of ω_{v}. In CARS, this oscillator is not driven by a single optical wave, but by the difference in frequency (ω_{p}-ω_{S}) between the pump and the Stokes beams instead. This driving mechanism is similar to hearing the low combination tone when striking two different high tone piano keys: your ear is sensitive to the difference in the frequencies of the high tones. Similarly, the Raman oscillator is susceptible to the difference in frequency between two optical waves. When the difference of frequency ω_{p}-ω_{S} approaches ω_{v}, the oscillator is driven very efficiently. On a molecular level, this implies that the electron cloud surrounding the chemical bond is vigorously oscillating with the frequency ω_{p}-ω_{S}. These electron motions alter the optical properties of the sample, i.e. there is a periodic modulation of the refractive index of the material. This periodic modulation can be probed by a third laser beam, the probe beam. When the probe beam is propagating through the periodically altered medium, it acquires the same modulation. Part of the probe, originally at ω_{pr} will now get modified to ω_{pr}+ω_{p}-ω_{S}, which is the observed anti-Stokes emission. Under certain beam geometries, the anti-Stokes emission may diffract away from the probe beam, and can be detected in a separate direction.

While intuitive, this classical picture does not take into account the quantum mechanical energy levels of the molecule. Quantum mechanically, the CARS process can be understood as follows. Our molecule is initially in the ground state, the lowest energy state of the molecule. The pump beam excites the molecule to a virtual state. A virtual state is not an eigenstate of the molecule and it can not be occupied but it does allow for transitions between otherwise unoccupied real states. If a Stokes beam is simultaneously present along with the pump, the virtual state can be used as an instantaneous gateway to address a vibrational eigenstate of the molecule. The joint action of the pump and the Stokes has effectively established a coupling between the ground state and the vibrationally excited state of the molecule. The molecule is now in two states at the same time: it resides in a coherent superposition of states. This coherence between the states can be probed by the probe beam, which promotes the system to a virtual state. Again, the molecule cannot stay in the virtual state and will fall back instantaneously to the ground state under the emission of a photon at the anti-Stokes frequency. The molecule is no longer in a superposition, as it resides again in one state, the ground state. In the quantum mechanical model, no energy is deposited in the molecule during the CARS process. Instead, the molecule acts like a medium for converting the frequencies of the three incoming waves into a CARS signal (a parametric process). There are, however, related coherent Raman processes that occur simultaneously which do deposit energy into the molecule.

== Comparison to Raman spectroscopy ==
CARS is often compared to Raman spectroscopy as both techniques probe the same Raman active modes. Raman can be done using a single continuous wave (CW) laser whereas CARS requires (generally) two pulsed laser sources. The Raman signal is detected on the red side of the incoming radiation where it might have to compete with other fluorescent processes. The CARS signal is detected on the blue side, which is free from fluorescence, but it comes with a non-resonant contribution. The differences between the signals from Raman and CARS (there are many variants of both techniques) stems largely from the fact that Raman relies on a spontaneous transition whereas CARS relies on a coherently driven transition. The total Raman signal collected from a sample is the incoherent addition of the signal from individual molecules. It is therefore linear in the concentration of those molecules and the signal is emitted in all directions. The total CARS signal comes from a coherent addition of the signal from individual molecules. For the coherent addition to be additive, phase-matching must be fulfilled. For tight focusing conditions this is generally not a restriction. Once phase-matching is fulfilled the signal amplitude grows linearly with distance so that the power grows quadratically. This signal forms a collimated beam that is therefore easily collected. The fact that the CARS signal is quadratic in the distance makes it quadratic with respect to the concentration and therefore especially sensitive to the majority constituent. The total CARS signal also contains an inherent non-resonant background. This non-resonant signal can be considered as the result of (several) far off-resonance transitions that also add coherently. The resonant amplitude contains a phase shift of π/2 radians over the resonance whereas the non-resonant part does not. The spectroscopic line shape of the CARS intensity therefore resembles a Fano profile which is shifted with respect to the Raman signal. To compare the spectra from multi-component compounds, the (resonant) CARS spectral amplitude should be compared to the Raman spectral intensity.

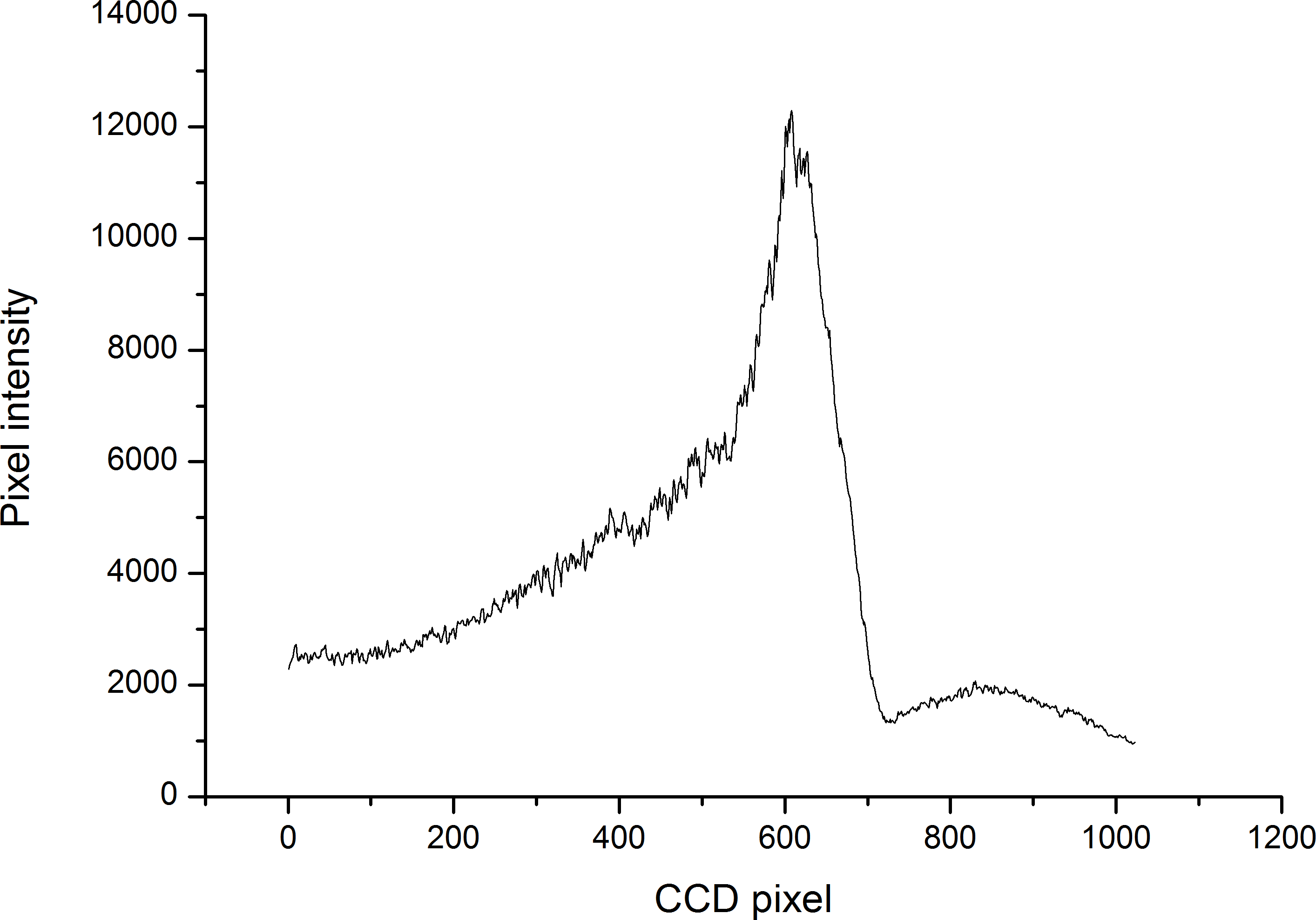
Coherent anti-Stokes Raman spectrum of microscopy oil. Pump beam: 800 nm; Stokes beam: broadband from 1000 nm to 1100 nm; anti-Stokes emission: centered to -1250 cm^{-1} (CH_{2} groups symmetric vibration).

Theoretically Raman spectroscopy and CARS spectroscopy are equally sensitive as they use the same molecular transitions. However, given the limits on input power (damage threshold) and detector noise (integration time), the signal from a single transition can be collected much faster in practical situations (a factor of 10^{5}) using CARS. Imaging of known substances (known spectra) is therefore often done using CARS. Given the fact that CARS is a higher order nonlinear process, the CARS signal from a single molecule is larger than the Raman signal from a single molecule for a sufficiently high driving intensity. However, at very low concentrations, the advantages of the coherent addition for the CARS signal are reduced and the presence of the incoherent background becomes an increasing problem.

Since CARS is such a nonlinear process there are not really any 'typical' experimental numbers. One example is given below under the explicit warning that just changing the pulse duration by one order of magnitude changes the CARS signal by three orders of magnitude. The comparison should only be used as an indication of the order of magnitude of the signals. 200 mW average power input (CW for the Raman), in a 0.9NA objective with a center wavelength around 800 nm, constitutes a power density of 26 MW/cm,^{2} (focus length = 1.5 micrometre, focus volume = 1.16 micrometre^{3}, photon energy = 2.31×10^{−19} J or 1.44 eV). The Raman cross section for the vibration of the aromatic ring in toluene around 1000 cm^{−1} is on the order of 10^{−29}cm^{2}/molecule·steradian. Therefore, the Raman signal is around 26×10^{−23} W/molecule·steradian or 3.3×10^{−21} W/molecule (over 4π steradians). That is 0.014 photon/sec·molecule. The density of toluene = 0.8668×10^{3} kg/m^{3}, molecular mass = 92.14×10^{−3} kg/mol. Therefore, the focal volume (~1 cubic micrometre) contains 6×10^{9} molecules. Those molecules together generate a Raman signal in the order of 2×10^{−11} W (20 pW) or roughly one hundred million photons/sec (over 4π steradians). A CARS experiment with similar parameters (150 mW at 1064 nm, 200 mW at 803.5 nm, 15ps pulses at 80 MHz repetition frequency, same objective lens) yields roughly 17.5×10^{−6} W (on the 3000 cm^{−1} line, which has 1/3 of the strength and roughly 3 times the width). This CARS power is roughly 10^{6} higher than the Raman but since there are 6×10^{9} molecules, the signal per molecule from CARS is only 4×10^{−25} W/molecule·s or 1.7×10^{−6} photons/molecule·s. If we allow two factors of three (line strength and line width) then the spontaneous Raman signal per molecule still exceeds the CARS per molecule by more than two orders of magnitude. The coherent addition of the CARS signal from the molecules however yields a total signal that is much higher than the Raman.

The sensitivity in many CARS experiments is not limited by the detection of CARS photons but rather by the distinction between the resonant and non-resonant part of the CARS signal.

== Coherent Stokes Raman spectroscopy ==
Coherent Stokes Raman spectroscopy (CSRS pronounced as "scissors") is a form of spectroscopy used primarily in chemistry, physics and related fields. It is closely related to Raman spectroscopy and lasing processes. It is very similar to Raman spectroscopy, but involves a lasing process that dramatically improves the signal.

It is very similar to the more common CARS except it uses an anti-Stokes frequency stimulation beam and a Stokes frequency beam is observed (the opposite of CARS). This is disadvantageous because anti-stokes processes must start in a less populated excited state.

== Applications ==
=== CARS Microscopy ===
CARS is used for species selective microscopy and combustion diagnostics. The first exploits the selectivity of vibrational spectroscopy. More recently, CARS microscopy has been utilized as a method for non-invasive imaging of lipids in biological samples, both in vivo and in vitro. Moreover, RP-CARS, a particular implementation of the Coherent anti-Stokes Raman spectroscopy microscopy, is used to study myelin and myelopathies. In 2020, Scully and team used femtosecond adaptive spectroscopic techniques via CARS to identify individual virus particles.

=== Combustion diagnostics ===
CARS spectroscopy can be used for temperature measurements and major species concentration; because the CARS signal is temperature dependent. The strength of the signal scales (non-linearly) with the difference in the ground state population and the vibrationally excited state population. Since the population of states follows the temperature dependent Boltzmann distribution, the CARS signal carries an intrinsic temperature dependence as well. This temperature dependence makes CARS a popular technique for monitoring the temperature of hot gases and flames.

=== Other applications ===
CARS-based detectors for roadside bombs are under development.

== See also ==
- Coherent Raman scattering microscopy
- Four-wave mixing
- Rotating-polarization coherent anti-Stokes Raman spectroscopy (RP-CARS)
