= Lock-in amplifier =

Type of amplifier that emphasizes a specific frequency in a noisy signal

A lock in amplifier uses a multiplier and a low pass filter to compare a reference signal against a noisy signal

A lock-in amplifier is a type of amplifier that can extract a signal with a known carrier wave from an extremely noisy environment. Depending on the dynamic reserve of the instrument, signals up to a million times smaller than noise components, potentially fairly close by in frequency, can still be reliably detected. It is essentially a homodyne detector followed by low-pass filter that is often adjustable in cut-off frequency and filter order.

The device is often used to measure phase shift, even when the signals are large, have a high signal-to-noise ratio and do not need further improvement.

Recovering signals at low signal-to-noise ratios requires a strong, clean reference signal with the same frequency as the received signal. This is not the case in many experiments, so the instrument can recover signals buried in the noise only in a limited set of circumstances.

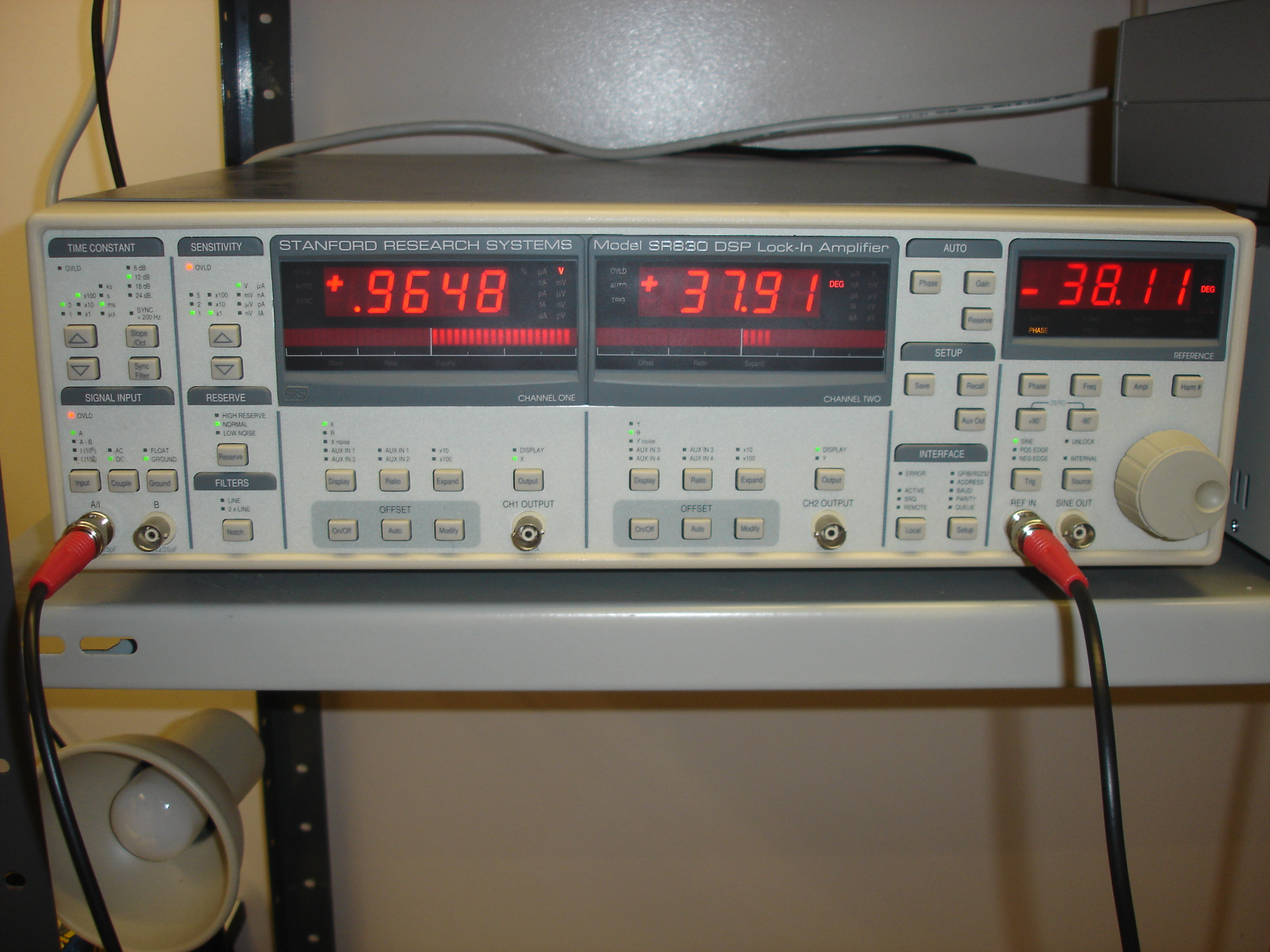
Example of a lock-in amplifier

The lock-in amplifier is commonly believed to have been invented by Princeton University physicist Robert H. Dicke who founded the company Princeton Applied Research (PAR) to market the product. However, in an interview with Martin Harwit, Dicke claims that even though he is often credited with the invention of the device, he believes that he read about it in a review of scientific equipment written by Walter C. Michels, a professor at Bryn Mawr College. This could have been a 1941 article by Michels and Curtis, which in turn cites a 1934 article by C. R. Cosens, while another timeless article was written by C. A. Stutt in 1949.

Whereas traditional lock-in amplifiers use analog frequency mixers and RC filters for the demodulation, state-of-the-art instruments have both steps implemented by fast digital signal processing, for example, on an FPGA. Usually sine and cosine demodulation is performed simultaneously, which is sometimes also referred to as dual-phase demodulation. This allows the extraction of the in-phase and the quadrature component that can then be transferred into polar coordinates, i.e. amplitude and phase, or further processed as real and imaginary part of a complex number (e.g. for complex FFT analysis).

== Basic principles ==
The operation of a lock-in amplifier relies on the orthogonality of sinusoidal functions. Specifically, when a sinusoidal function of frequency f_{1} is multiplied by a sinusoidal function of another frequency f_{2} and integrated over a time much longer than the period of the two functions, the result is close to zero. If instead f_{1} is equal to f_{2} and the two functions are in phase, the average value is equal to half of the product of the amplitudes.

In essence, a lock-in amplifier takes the input signal, multiplies it by the reference signal (either provided from the internal oscillator or an external source, and can be sinusoidal or square wave), and integrates it over a specified time, usually on the order of milliseconds to a few seconds. The resulting signal is a DC signal, where the contribution from any signal that is not at the same frequency as the reference signal is attenuated close to zero. The out-of-phase component of the signal that has the same frequency as the reference signal is also attenuated (because sine functions are orthogonal to the cosine functions of the same frequency), making a lock-in a phase-sensitive detector.

For a sine reference signal and an input waveform $U_\text{in}(t)$, the DC output signal $U_\text{out}(t)$ can be calculated for an analog lock-in amplifier as

$$U_\text{out}(t) = \frac{1}{T} \int_{t-T}^t \sin\left[2\pi f_\text{ref} \cdot s + \varphi\right] U_\text{in}(s) \,ds,$$

where φ is a phase that can be set on the lock-in (set to zero by default).

If the averaging time T is large enough (i.e. much larger than the signal period) to suppress all unwanted parts like noise and the variations at twice the reference frequency, the output is

$$U_\text{out} = \frac{1}{2} V_\text{sig} \cos\theta,$$

where $V_\text{sig}$ is the signal amplitude at the reference frequency, and $\theta$ is the phase difference between the signal and reference.

Many applications of the lock-in amplifier require recovering only the signal amplitude rather than relative phase to the reference signal. For a simple so called single-phase lock-in-amplifier the phase difference is adjusted (usually manually) to zero to get the full signal.

More advanced, so called two-phase lock-in-amplifiers have a second detector, doing the same calculation as before, but with an additional 90° phase shift. Thus one has two outputs: $X = V_\text{sig} \cos\theta$ is called the "in-phase" component, and $Y = V_\text{sig} \sin\theta$ the "quadrature" component. These two quantities represent the signal as a vector relative to the lock-in reference oscillator. By computing the magnitude (R) of the signal vector, the phase dependency is removed:

$$R = \sqrt{X^2 + Y^2} = \frac{V_\text{sig}}{2}.$$

The phase can be calculated from

$$\theta = \arctan\left(\frac{Y}{X}\right).$$

== Digital lock-in amplifiers ==
The majority of today's lock-in amplifiers are based on high-performance digital signal processing (DSP). Over the last 20 years, digital lock-in amplifiers have been replacing analog models across the entire frequency range, allowing users to perform measurements up to a frequency of 8.5 GHz. Initial problems of the first digital lock-in amplifiers, e.g. the presence of digital clock noise on the input connectors, could be completely eliminated by use of improved electronic components and better instrument design. Today's digital lock-in amplifiers outperform analog models in all relevant performance parameters, such as frequency range, input noise, stability and dynamic reserve. In addition to better performance, digital lock-in amplifiers can include multiple demodulators, which allows analyzing a signal with different filter settings or at multiple different frequencies simultaneously. Moreover, experimental data can be analyzed with additional tools such as an oscilloscope, FFT spectrum analyzers, boxcar averager or used to provide feedback by using internal PID controllers. Some models of the digital lock-in amplifiers are computer-controlled and feature a graphical user interface (can be a platform-independent browser user interface) and a choice of programming interfaces.

== Signal measurement in noisy environments ==
Typical experimental setup

Signal recovery takes advantage of the fact that noise is often spread over a much wider range of frequencies than the signal. In the simplest case of white noise, even if the root mean square of noise is 10^{3} times as large as the signal to be recovered, if the bandwidth of the measurement instrument can be reduced by a factor much greater than 10^{6} around the signal frequency, then the equipment can be relatively insensitive to the noise. In a typical 100 MHz bandwidth (e.g. an oscilloscope), a bandpass filter with width much narrower than 100 MHz would accomplish this. The averaging time of the lock-in amplifier determines the bandwidth and allows very narrow filters, less than 1 Hz if needed. However, this comes at the price of a slow response to changes in the signal.

In summary, even when noise and signal are indistinguishable in the time domain, if the signal has a definite frequency band and there is no large noise peak within that band, then the noise and signal can be separated sufficiently in the frequency domain.

If the signal is either slowly varying or otherwise constant (essentially a DC signal), then 1/f noise typically overwhelms the signal. It may then be necessary to use external means to modulate the signal. For example, when detecting a small light signal against a bright background, the signal can be modulated either by a chopper wheel, acousto-optical modulator, photoelastic modulator at a large enough frequency so that 1/f noise drops off significantly, and the lock-in amplifier is referenced to the operating frequency of the modulator. In the case of an atomic-force microscope, to achieve nanometer and piconewton resolution, the cantilever position is modulated at a high frequency, to which the lock-in amplifier is again referenced.

When the lock-in technique is applied, care must be taken to calibrate the signal, because lock-in amplifiers generally detect only the root-mean-square signal of the operating frequency. For a sinusoidal modulation, this would introduce a factor of $\sqrt{2}$ between the lock-in amplifier output and the peak amplitude of the signal, and a different factor for non-sinusoidal modulation.

In the case of nonlinear systems, higher harmonics of the modulation frequency appear. A simple example is the light of a conventional light bulb being modulated at twice the line frequency. Some lock-in amplifiers also allow separate measurements of these higher harmonics.

Furthermore, the response width (effective bandwidth) of detected signal depends on the amplitude of the modulation. Generally, linewidth/modulation function has a monotonically increasing, non-linear behavior.

=== Applications ===
An example application of the above signal measurement principles can be found in some nondispersive infrared sensors. Infrared light is band-pass filtered to a region of the frequency spectrum that is predominantly absorbed by some gas of interest. This can then be detected, either by comparing to absorption in a second chamber containing a known reference gas, or by detecting the interaction between IR and gas particles using an acoustic sensor (see photoacoustic spectroscopy). If the signal needs to be amplified, a lock-in amplifier can be used by pulsing the IR source at a known frequency, and then feeding this frequency to the amplifier so only corresponding signals get amplified.

In materials science, a vibrating-sample magnetometer (VSM) uses a lock-in amplifier to measure the magnetic properties of a sample. In a VSM, a magnetic sample is vibrated at a known frequency which induces an oscillating signal in nearby induction coils. The frequency of the signal is exactly equal to the vibration frequency. When the signal and driving frequency are compared in the lock-in amplifier, the result is proportional to the magnetic moment of the sample.

== Publications ==
- Scofield, John H. (February 1994). "Frequency-domain description of a lock-in amplifier". American Journal of Physics. 62 (2). AAPT: 129–133. Bibcode:1994AmJPh..62..129S. doi:10.1119/1.17629.
- Jaquier, Pierre-Alain; Jaquier, Alain (March 1994). "Multiple-channel digital lock-in amplifier with PPM resolution". Review of Scientific Instruments. 65 (3). AIP: 747. Bibcode:1994RScI...65..747P. doi:10.1063/1.1145096.
- Wang, Xiaoyi (1990). "Sensitive digital lock-in amplifier using a personal computer". Review of Scientific Instruments. 61 (70). AIP: 1999–2001. Bibcode:1990RScI...61.1999W. doi:10.1063/1.1141413.
- Wolfson, Richard (June 1991). "The lock-in amplifier: A student experiment". American Journal of Physics. 59 (6). AAPT: 569–572. Bibcode:1991AmJPh..59..569W. doi:10.1119/1.16824.
- Dixon, Paul K.; Wu, Lei (October 1989). "Broadband digital lock-in amplifier techniques". Review of Scientific Instruments. 60 (10). AIP: 3329. Bibcode:1989RScI...60.3329D. doi:10.1063/1.1140523.
- van Exter, Martin; Lagendijk, Ad (March 1986). "Converting an AM radio into a high-frequency lock-in amplifier in a stimulated Raman experiment". Review of Scientific Instruments. 57 (3). AIP: 390. Bibcode:1986RScI...57..390V. doi:10.1063/1.1138952.
- Probst, P. A.; Collet, B. (March 1985). "Low-frequency digital lock-in amplifier". Review of Scientific Instruments. 56 (3). AIP: 466. Bibcode:1985RScI...56..466P. doi:10.1063/1.1138324.
- Temple, Paul A. (1975). "An introduction to phase-sensitive amplifiers: An inexpensive student instrument". American Journal of Physics. 43 (9). AAPT: 801–807. Bibcode:1975AmJPh..43..801T. doi:10.1119/1.9690.
- Burdett, Richard (2005). "Amplitude Modulated Signals - The Lock-in Amplifier". Handbook of Measuring System Design. Wiley. doi:10.1002/0471497398.mm588. ISBN 978-0-470-02143-9.
- Rehman, A.; An, T.; Choi, W. (2024). "A Novel Lock-In Amplification-Based Frequency Component Extraction Method for Performance Analysis and Power Monitoring of Grid-Connected Systems". Energies. 17 (18). MDPI: 4850. doi:10.3390/en17184580.
- Rehman, A.; Choi, W. J. (2024). "A Power Measurement Method for Electric Automotive Variable-Frequency Drive Systems". IEEE Transactions on Industry Applications. 60 (5). IEEE: 7333–7341. Bibcode:2024IOJIA..60.7333R. doi:10.1109/TIA.2024.3402191.
