= Anke Kracke =

German physicist (born 1983)

- Born: Anke Wagner; 8 September 1983 (age 42); Mainz, Germany
- Education: MPIK
- Awards: Helmholtz Prize (2012)
- Scientific career
- Fields: Particle physics; metrology
- Institutions: MPIK; Florida State University
- Thesis: The g-factor of the valence electron bound in lithiumlike silicon ^{28}Si^{11+}: The most stringent test of relativistic many-electron calculations in a magnetic field (2013)
- Doctoral advisor: Klaus Blaum

Anke Kracke (born Anke Wagner, 8 September 1983 in Mainz) is a German experimental physicist affiliated with the Max Planck Institute for Nuclear Physics, Heidelberg (MPIK).

Kracke studied physics at the Johannes Gutenberg University of Mainz. In 2007, she began doctoral work with Klaus Blaum at MPIK. She defended her thesis, The g-factor of the valence electron bound in lithiumlike silicon ^{28}Si^{11+}: The most stringent test of relativistic many-electron calculations in a magnetic field, in 2013. She subsequently worked as a post-doctoral researcher at Florida State University with Edmund G. Myers.

In 2012, she won the Helmholtz Prize for precision measurements together with her doctoral supervisor Klaus Blaum and Sven Sturm.
