= Povkh =

Povkh or Povh (Ukrainian: Повх) is a surname. Notable people with the surname include:

- Bogdan Povh (1932–2024), Slovenian-German physicist
- Ksenja Povh (born 1987), Slovenian footballer
- Olesya Povh (born 1987), Ukrainian sprint athlete
- Mariya Povkh (born 1989), Ukrainian canoeist
