= Dieter Pohl (physicist) =

German physicist

Dieter Pohl (Wolfgang Dieter Pohl, born 1938) is a German–Swiss physicist. He became known especially for his pioneering works in nano-optics, near field optics (NFO), and plasmonics.

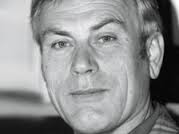
Dieter Pohl, physicist

Pohl studied at the University of Stuttgart and the Technical University of Munich (TUM) where he did his doctorate with Wolfgang Kaiser. In 1968, he moved to IBM Zurich Research Laboratory in Rüschlikon and 1998 to University of Basel. He was appointed titular professor in 2002.

In 1982, he invented and developed the near-field scanning optical microscopy (NSOM/SNOM)., the first optical instrument that provided optical resolution far beyond Abbe's diffraction limit, e.g. 20 nm at wavelength 515 nm. In the following years the close relation between optical near-fields and plasmons was investigated, contributing to the emergence of the new field of plasmonics.

1999 Dieter Pohl suggested antennas as ideal sources or probes of localized optical near-fields. The problem was that optical antennas have to be 1000000 times smaller than the TV antennas one can see on any roof. By 2005, Dieter and his coworkers had solved the problem and could demonstrate for the first time the resonance and lifetime-reducing properties of nanometer-sized dipole antennas as well as an extremely high local intensity in the (antenna) gap, the place where the wires of a TV antenna are fixed. The intensity caused higher order nonlinear light emission, an interesting fact in view of the tiny near-field spot.

In 1992, Dieter Pohl and Daniel Courjon organized a workshop on near-field optics (NFO) that was to become the origin of bi-annual international NFO-x conferences (2018: x = 15), a platform for nano-, near-field-, nonlinear optics, plasmonics, metamaterials, quantum information, biosensing and ultrafast dynamics.

Dieter Pohl contributed to various reviews and book publications. He acted as reviewer for the Swiss National Science Foundation (SNF) and the German DFG. A complete list of his papers and inventions will be found on his home page.

Publications and Patents

≈121 publications

≈20 patents, mostly on scanning probe microscopy, micromechanics, storage; diverse publications in the IBM Technical Disclosure Bulletin

Awards and Honors

- 1996 Carl-Zeiss Research Award
- 1997 Rank Prize for Electro-Optics
- 1999 Humboldt Research Prize
- 1968-1998 various IBM internal awards
- 2013 Stern-Gerlach Medal of the German Physical Society

Memberships

- Swiss Physical Society
- German Physical Society
