= Keitel =

Keitel is a German surname. Notable people with the surname include:

- Christoph Helmut Keitel (born 1965), German physicist
- Harvey Keitel (born 1939), American actor
- Jesse James Keitel (born 1993), American actress
- Klaus Keitel (1929-2026), German journalist and politician
- Sebastián Keitel (born 1973), Chilean sprinter
- Wilhelm Keitel (1882–1946), German World War II field marshal, executed for war crimes
- Yannik Keitel (born 2000), German footballer
