= Tip-enhanced Raman spectroscopy =

Tip-enhanced Raman spectroscopy (TERS) is a variant of surface-enhanced Raman spectroscopy (SERS) that combines scanning probe microscopy with Raman spectroscopy. High spatial resolution chemical imaging is possible via TERS, with routine demonstrations of nanometer spatial resolution under ambient laboratory conditions, or better at ultralow temperatures and high pressure.

The maximum resolution achievable using an optical microscope, including Raman microscopes, is limited by the Abbe limit, which is approximately half the wavelength of the incident light. Furthermore, with SERS spectroscopy the signal obtained is the sum of a relatively large number of molecules. TERS overcomes these limitations as the Raman spectrum obtained originates primarily from the molecules within a few tens of nanometers of the tip.

Although the antennas' electric near-field distributions are commonly understood to determine the spatial resolution, recent experiments showing subnanometer-resolved optical images put this understanding into question. This is because such images enter a regime in which classical electrodynamical descriptions might no longer be applicable and quantum plasmonic and atomistic effects could become relevant.

== History ==
The earliest reports of tip enhanced Raman spectroscopy typically used a Raman microscope coupled with an atomic force microscope. Tip-enhanced Raman spectroscopy coupled with a scanning tunneling microscope (STM-TERS) has also become a reliable technique, since it utilizes the gap mode plasmon between the metallic probe and the metallic substrate.

== Equipment ==
Tip-enhanced Raman spectroscopy requires a confocal microscope, and a scanning probe microscope. The optical microscope is used to align the laser focal point with the tip coated with a SERS active metal. The three typical experimental configurations are bottom illumination, side illumination, and top illumination, depending on which direction the incident laser propagates towards the sample, with respect to the substrate. In the case of STM-TERS, only side and top illumination configurations can be applied, since the substrate is required to be conductive, therefore typically being non-transparent. In this case, the incident laser is usually linearly polarized and aligned parallel to the tip, in order to generate confined surface plasmon at the tip apex. The sample is moved rather than the tip so that the laser remains focused on the tip. The sample can be moved systematically to build up a series of tip enhanced Raman spectra from which a Raman map of the surface can be built allowing for surface heterogeneity to be assessed with up to 1.7 nm resolution. Subnanometer resolution has been demonstrated in certain cases allowing for submolecular features to be resolved.

A fiber-in-fiber-out near-field scanning optical microscopy (NSOM) probe design for lens-free TERS measurement.

In 2019, Yan group and Liu group at University of California, Riverside developed a lens-free nanofocusing technique, which concentrates the incident light from a tapered optical fiber to the tip apex of a metallic nanowire and collects the Raman signal through the same optical fiber. Fiber-in-fiber-out NSOM-TERS has been developed.

== Applications ==
Several research have used TERS to image single atoms and the internal structure of the molecules. In 2019, the Ara Apkarian group at the Center for Chemistry at the Space-Time Limit, University of California, Irvine imaged vibrational normal modes of single porphyrin molecules using TERS. TERS-based DNA sequencing has also been demonstrated.
