= Werner Hofmann =

Werner Hofmann may refer to:

- Werner Hofmann (art historian) (1928–2013), Austrian art historian
- Werner Hofmann (physicist) (born 1952), German physicist
