= Raman microscope =

Laser microscope used for Raman spectroscopy

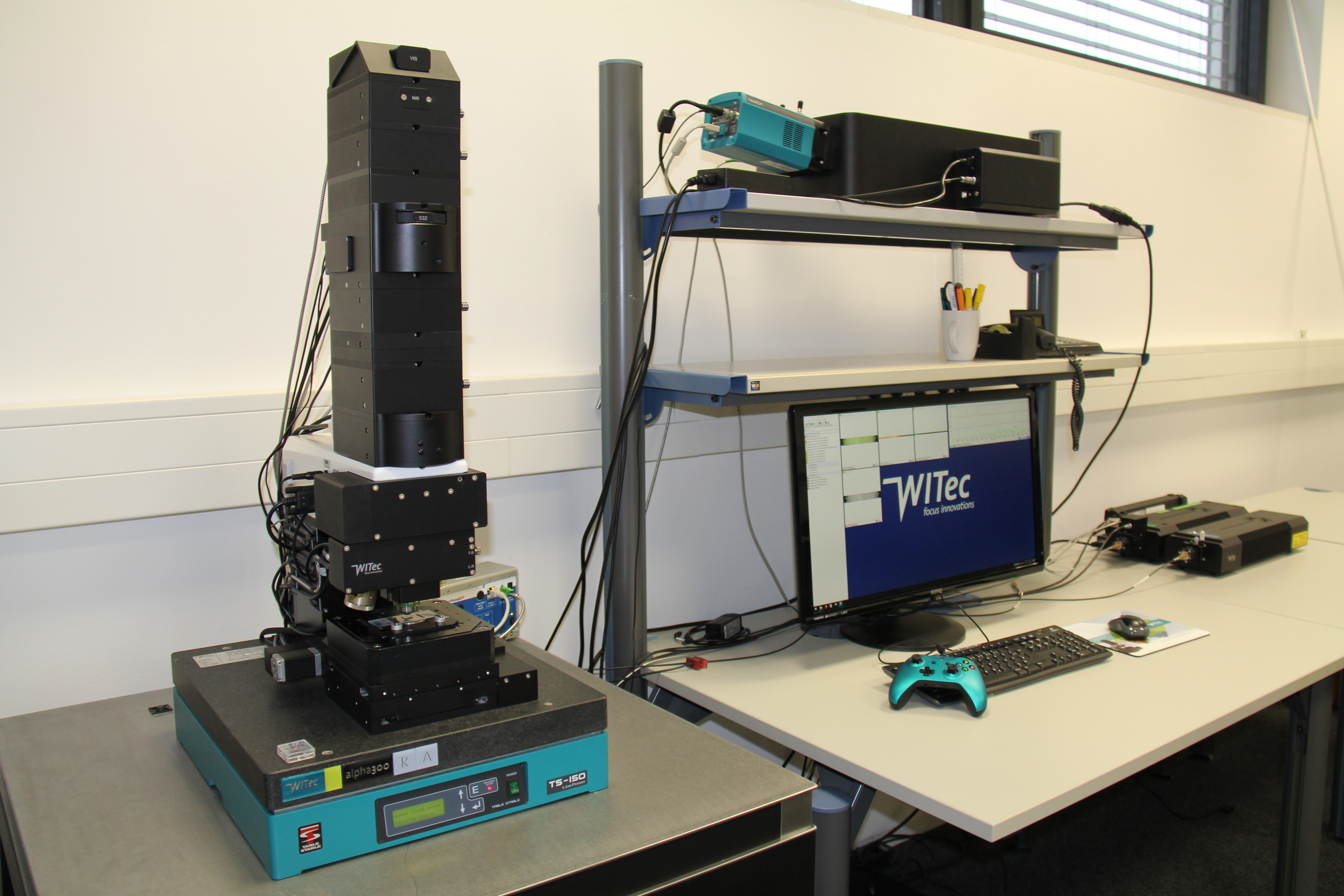
Confocal Raman imaging microscope

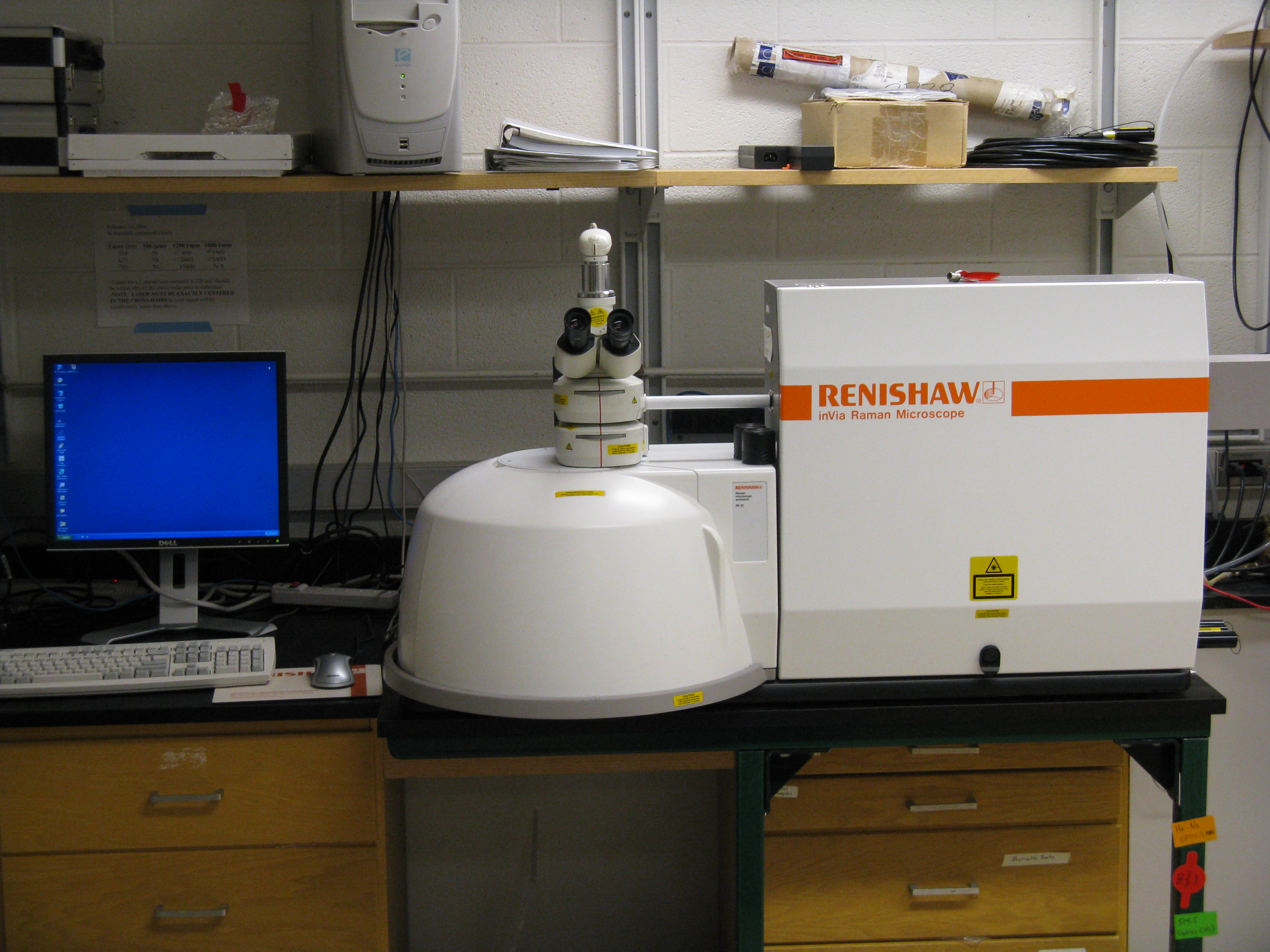
Raman microscope

The Raman microscope is a laser-based microscopic device used to perform Raman spectroscopy. The term MOLE (molecular optics laser examiner) is used to refer to the Raman-based microprobe. The technique used is named after C. V. Raman, who discovered the scattering properties in liquids.

== Configuration ==
The Raman microscope begins with a standard optical microscope, and adds an excitation laser, laser rejection filters, a spectrometer or monochromator, and an optical sensitive detector such as a charge-coupled device (CCD), or photomultiplier tube, (PMT). Traditionally Raman microscopy was used to measure the Raman spectrum of a point on a sample, more recently the technique has been extended to implement Raman spectroscopy for direct chemical imaging over the whole field of view on a 3D sample.

== Imaging modes ==
In direct imaging, the whole field of view is examined for scattering over a small range of wavenumbers (Raman shifts). For instance, a wavenumber characteristic for cholesterol could be used to record the distribution of cholesterol within a cell culture. The other approach is hyperspectral imaging or chemical imaging, in which thousands of Raman spectra are acquired from all over the field of view. The data can then be used to generate images showing the location and amount of different components. Taking the cell culture example, a hyperspectral image could show the distribution of cholesterol, as well as proteins, nucleic acids, and fatty acids. Sophisticated signal- and image-processing techniques can be used to ignore the presence of water, culture media, buffers, and other interference.

== Resolution ==
Raman microscopy, and in particular confocal microscopy, can reach down to sub-micrometer lateral spatial resolution. Because a Raman microscope is a diffraction-limited system, its spatial resolution depends on the wavelength of light and the numerical aperture of the focusing element. In confocal Raman microscopy, the diameter of the confocal aperture is an additional factor. As a rule of thumb, the lateral spatial resolution can reach approximately the laser wavelength when using air objective lenses, while oil or water immersion objectives can provide lateral resolutions of around half the laser wavelength. This means that when operated in the visible to near-infrared range, a Raman microscope can achieve lateral resolutions of approx. 1 µm down to 250 nm, while the depth resolution (if not limited by the optical penetration depth of the sample) can range from 1-6 µm with the smallest confocal pinhole aperture to tens of micrometers when operated without a confocal pinhole. Since the objective lenses of microscopes focus the laser beam down to the micrometer range, the resulting photon flux is much higher than achieved in conventional Raman setups. This has the added effect of increased photobleaching of molecules emitting interfering fluorescence. However, the high photon flux can also cause sample degradation, and thus, for each type of sample, the laser wavelength and laser power have to be carefully selected.

== Raman imaging ==
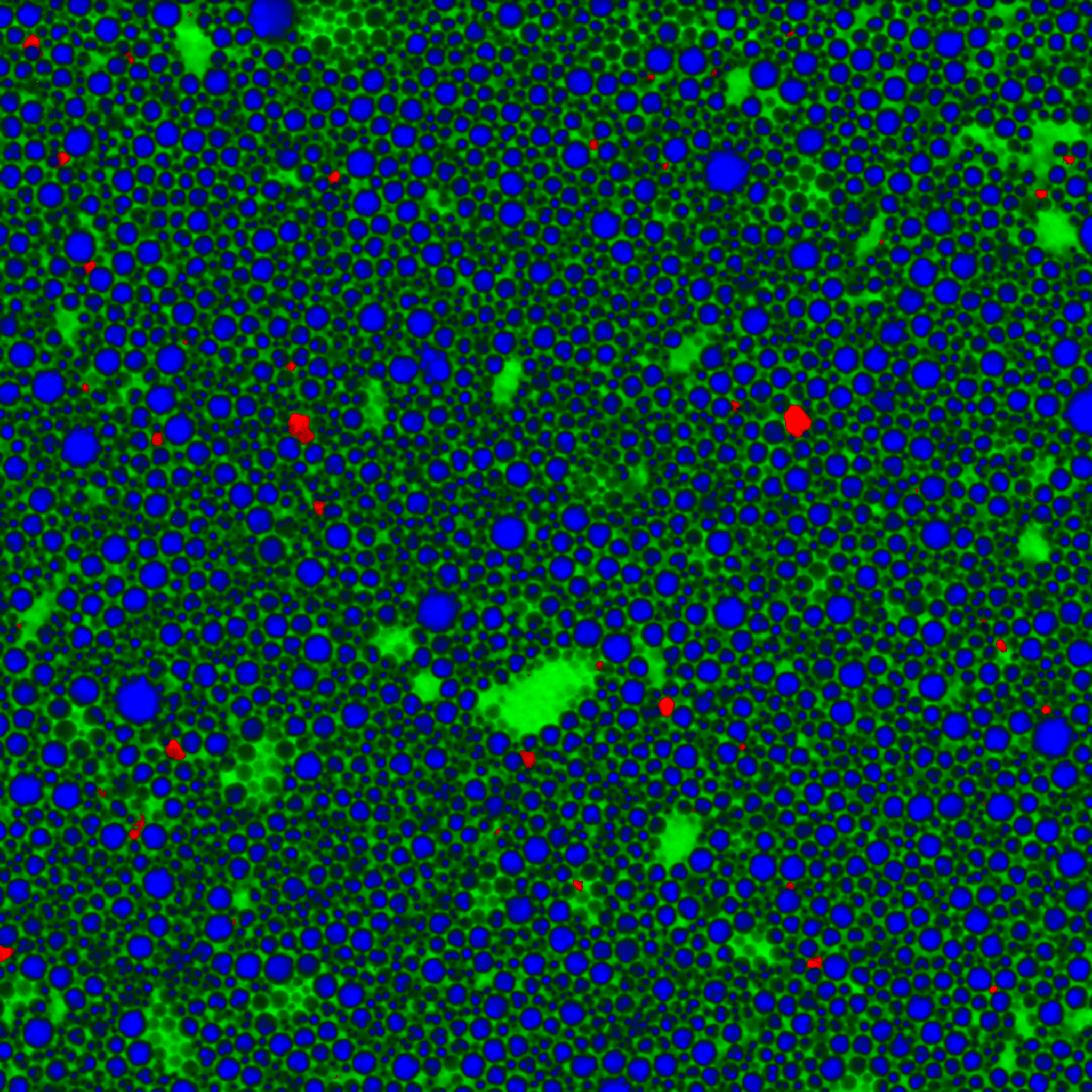
Chemical image of a pharmaceutical emulsion acquired by confocal Raman microscopy (alpha300 microscope, WITec; blue: Active pharmaceutical ingredient, green: Oil, red: Silicon impurities).

Another tool that is becoming more popular is global Raman imaging. This technique is being used for the characterization of large scale devices, mapping of different compounds and dynamics study. It has already been used for the characterization of graphene layers, J-aggregated dyes inside carbon nanotubes and multiple other 2D materials such as MoS_{2} and WSe_{2}. Since the excitation beam is dispersed over the whole field of view, those measurements can be done without damaging the sample. By using Raman microspectroscopy, in vivo time- and space-resolved Raman spectra of microscopic regions of samples can be measured. As a result, the fluorescence of water, media, and buffers can be removed. Consequently, it is suitable to examine proteins, cells and organelles.

Raman microscopy for biological and medical specimens generally uses near-infrared (NIR) lasers (785 nm diodes and 1064 nm Nd:YAG are especially common). This reduces the risk of damaging the specimen by applying higher energy wavelengths. However, the intensity of NIR Raman scattering is low (owing to the ω^{4} dependence of Raman scattering intensity), and most detectors require very long collection times. Recently, more sensitive detectors have become available, making the technique better suited to general use. Raman microscopy of inorganic specimens, such as rocks, ceramics and polymers, can use a broader range of excitation wavelengths.

A related technique, tip-enhanced Raman spectroscopy, can produce high-resolution hyperspectral images of single molecules and DNA.

== Correlative Raman imaging ==
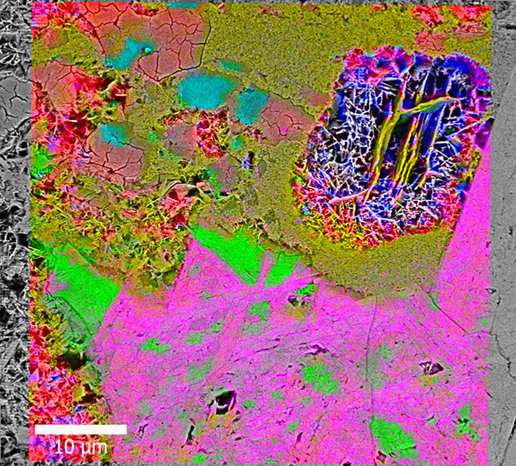
Correlative Raman-SEM imaging of a hematite (taken with RISE microscope, WITec). The Raman image is overlaid over the SEM image.

Confocal Raman microscopy can be combined with numerous other microscopy techniques. By using different methods and correlating the data, the user attains a more comprehensive understanding of the sample. Common examples of correlative microscopy techniques are Raman-AFM, Raman-SNOM, and Raman-SEM.

Correlative SEM-Raman imaging is the integration of a confocal Raman microscope into an SEM chamber which allows correlative imaging of several techniques, such as SE, BSE, EDX, EBSD, EBIC, CL, AFM. The sample is placed in the vacuum chamber of the electron microscope. Both analysis methods are then performed automatically at the same sample location. The obtained SEM and Raman images can then be superimposed. Moreover, adding a focused ion beam (FIB) on the chamber allows removal of the material and therefore 3D imaging of the sample. Low-vacuum mode allows analysis on biological and non-conductive samples.

== Biological Applications ==
By using Raman microspectroscopy, in vivo time- and space-resolved Raman spectra of microscopic regions of samples can be measured. Sampling is non-destructive and water, media, and buffers typically do not interfere with the analysis. Consequently, in vivo time- and space-resolved Raman spectroscopy is suitable to examine proteins, cells and organs. In the field of microbiology, confocal Raman microspectroscopy has been used to map intracellular distributions of macromolecules, such as proteins, polysaccharides, and nucleic acids and polymeric inclusions, such as poly-β-hydroxybutyric acid and polyphosphates in bacteria and sterols in microalgae. Combining stable isotopic probing (SIP) experiments with confocal Raman microspectroscopy has permitted determination of assimilation rates of ^{13}C and ^{15}N-substrates as well as D_{2}O by individual bacterial cells.

== See also ==
- Raman scattering
- Coherent Raman Scattering Microscopy
- Scanning electron microscope
- Tip-enhanced Raman spectroscopy
