= Stefan Ulmer =

Stefan Ulmer may refer to:

- Stefan Ulmer (ice hockey)
- Stefan Ulmer (physicist)
