= Near-field optics =

Near-field optics is that branch of optics that considers configurations that depend on the passage of light to, from, through, or near an element with subwavelength features, and the coupling of that light to a second element located a subwavelength distance from the first. The barrier of spatial resolution imposed by the very nature of light itself in conventional optical microscopy contributed significantly to the development of near-field optical devices, most notably the near-field scanning optical microscope, or NSOM. The relatively new optical science of dressed photons (DPs) can also find its origin in near-field optics.

== Size constraints ==
The limit of optical resolution in a conventional microscope, the so-called diffraction limit, is in the order of half the wavelength of the light used to image. Thus, when imaging at visible wavelengths, the smallest resolvable features are several hundred nanometers in size (although point-like sources, such as quantum dots, can be resolved quite readily). Using near-field optical techniques, researchers currently resolve features in the order of tens of nanometers in size. While other imaging techniques (e.g. atomic force microscopy and electron microscopy) can resolve features of much smaller size, the many advantages of optical microscopy make near-field optics a field of considerable interest.

== History ==
The notion of developing a near-field optical device was first conceived by Edward Hutchinson Synge in 1928 but was not realized experimentally until the 1950s when several researchers demonstrated the feasibility of sub-wavelength resolution. Published images of sub-wavelength resolution appeared when Ash and Nichols examined gratings with line spacing less than one millimeter using microwaves of 3 cm wavelength. In 1982 Dieter Pohl at IBM in Zurich, Switzerland, first obtained sub-wavelength resolution at visible wavelengths using near-field optical techniques.

== See also ==
- Arago spot
- Near and far field, the general principle in electromagnetism
