= Center for Chemistry at the Space-Time Limit =

US research center

- Motto: Visualize Single Chemical Event
- Active: 2008–2020
- Parent institution: University of California, Irvine
- Director: Vartkess Ara Apkarian
- Managing Director: Venkat Bommisetty
- Academic staff: 80
- Administrative staff: 3
- Location: Irvine, California
- Campus: University of California, Irvine (HQ). Partner Institutions: Northwestern University, University of Pittsburgh, PennState, University of Utah.
- Website: www.castl.uci.edu

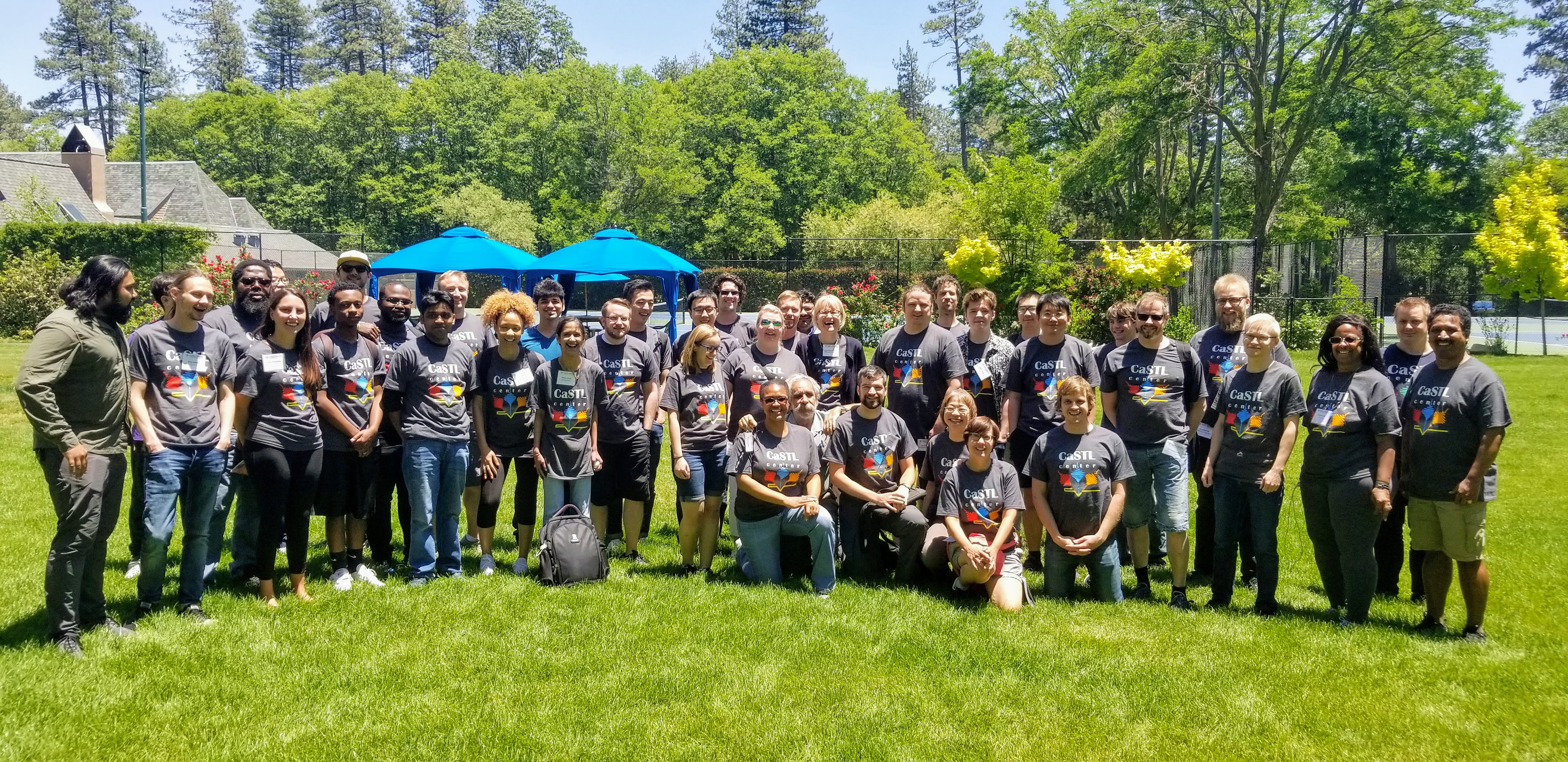
Center for Chemistry at the Space-Time Limit Group photo taken at the CaSTL Annual Symposium, Lake Arrowhead Conference Center, CA, USA.

Center for Chemistry at the Space-Time Limit or CaSTL Center is a National Science Foundation Center for Chemical Innovation.

The CaSTL Center was established through a cooperative agreement between the National Science Foundation and the University of California, Irvine in 2008. Vartkess Ara Apkarian, a Professor of Chemistry at the University of California Irvine, is the director of the center. Notable members of the center include researchers in nanoscience such as Richard Van Duyne, Hrvoje Petek, Wilson Ho, H. Kumar Wickramasinghe, George Schatz, Eric Potma, Lasse Jensen, Matt Law, Nien-Hui Ge, Jennifer Shumaker-Parry, Ruqian Wu.

== Mission ==
The mission of the CaSTL Center is "develop the essential science and technology to probe single chemical events in real space and time". CaSTL researchers proposed and developed a new tool, called Chemiscope, a chemist's microscope, to accomplish this goal.

== Accomplishments ==
=== Microscopy with a Single Molecule Scanning Electrometer ===
CaSTL researchers developed experimental & theoretical tools to image electrostatic fields and charge distributions with sub-nanometer spatial resolution. They demonstrated the first single molecule limit in miniaturization of microElectroMechanical Systems (SMEMS). They demonstrated that vibrations of a single tip-attached carbon monoxide molecule can serve as a force sensor and can act as an electric-to-mechanical force transducer where the vibrations are read optically via tip-enhanced Raman spectroscopy. This discovery enabled researchers to access electric fields, capacitance and conductivity within molecules, which will impact fields ranging from molecular electronics to catalytic chemistry.

=== Imaging Vibrational Normal Modes of Single Molecules ===
Internal vibrations of molecules determine the structural transformations that determine chemistry such as reactivity. A CaSTL team led by Vartkess Ara Apkarian measured the vibrational normal modes of a single cobalt-tetraphenylporphyrin molecule on a copper surface with atomically confined light. This study used a variant of Tip-Enhanced Raman Spectroscopy to measure vibrational spectra within a single molecule. Chemists use a variety of tools, including Infrared spectroscopy, to measure vibrations of molecules, however, measuring the normal modes of a single molecule has been elusive because microscopy with atomistic resolution requires a magnification nearly three orders of magnitude higher than the optical diffraction limit.

== Broader impacts ==
The CaSTL Center organized several scientific events such as symposia, workshops, summer schools on single molecule chemistry. Noted among these are the 2018 Telluride Workshop on Molecular Videography and a symposium with the theme "Toward Chemistry in Real Space and Time" at the 2019 Fall Meeting of the American Chemical Society.

=== Informal Science Education ===
An educational video game titled Bond Breaker was developed by CaSTL scientists in collaboration with TestTubeGames where players are introduced to light–matter interactions through a series of problems that they must solve. This game become very popular and featured on the front page of Scientific American. This game is currently available on several gaming platforms across the world. A Classroom version of the game, Bond Breaker - Classroom Edition, based on Next-Generation Science Standards, was released in 2019. This video game consists of a series of game levels, animations, quizzes and NGSS Lesson plans. The characters in this game were chosen to promote diversity and equity in STEM disciplines.

=== Science Animations ===
CaSTL scientists helped the development of a series of science animations, such as What is an Atom and How Do We Know?, What are Atoms Made of?, What is a Molecule?, and How to See a Virus, explaining the basic concepts of nanoscience to the broader public.

=== CaSTL - ASU Pathways Program ===
CaSTL scientists partnered with the Albany State University to provide Summer Research Experience to the underrepresented undergraduate students with the support from University of California, Office of the President. This program later attracted participation from other historically black colleges and universities institutions such as Hampton University, Tuskegee University.
