= Kumar Wickramasinghe =

British scientist

Kumar Wickramasinghe FRS
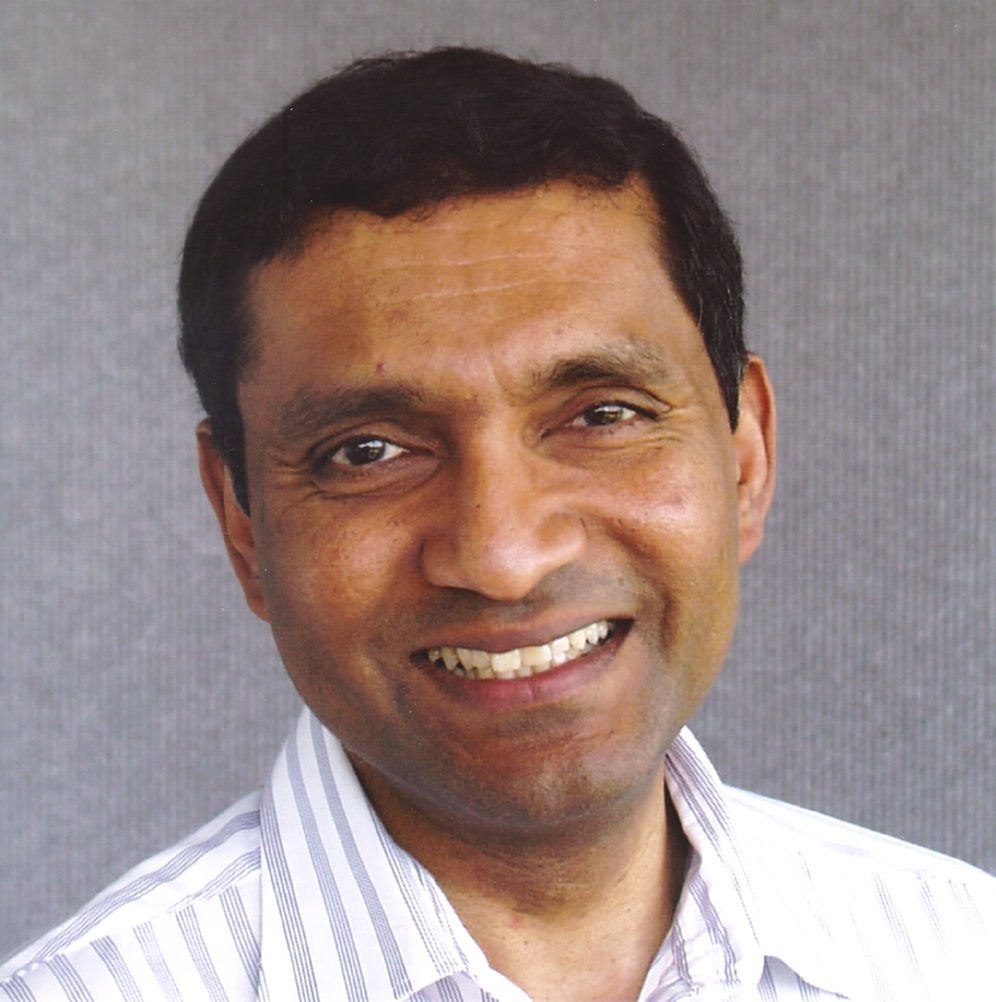
- Born: Hemantha Kumar Wickramasinghe
- Education: King's College London (BSc); University College London (PhD)
- Known for: Scanning thermal microscopy
- Awards: Joseph F. Keithley Award For Advances in Measurement Science (2000)
- Scientific career
- Fields: Scanning probe microscopy Nanotechnology; Nanobiotechnology
- Workplaces: University of California, Irvine
- Thesis: Two and Three Dimensional Acoustic Holography in Solids (1974)
- Doctoral advisor: Eric Ash
- Website: engineering.uci.edu/users/h-kumar-wickramasinghe

Hemantha Kumar Wickramasinghe is a British scientist who is Nicolaos G. and Sue Curtis Alexopoulos Presidential Chair in Electrical Engineering and Computer Science at the University of California, Irvine.

== Education ==
He graduated from King's College London with a Bachelor of Science degree in Electronic and Electrical Engineering in 1970 and a PhD in Electronic and Electrical Engineering from University College London in 1974 where his advisor was Eric Ash.

== Career and research ==
He was awarded the Joseph F. Keithley Award For Advances in Measurement Science in 2000. He was elected a Fellow of the Royal Society (FRS) in 2019. He is a member of the Center for Chemistry at the Space-Time Limit.

== Personal life ==
He is the brother of noted mathematician, astronomer and astrobiologist Chandra Wickramasinghe.
