= Campanile probe =

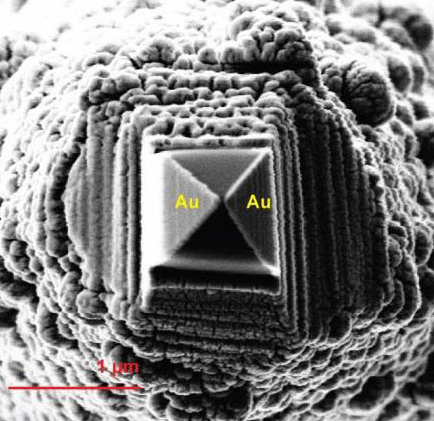
SEM image of a campanile probe.

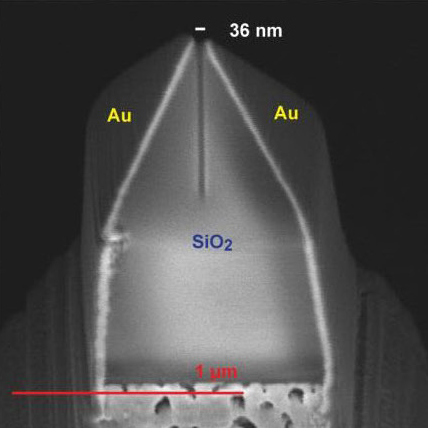
SEM image of a campanile probe.

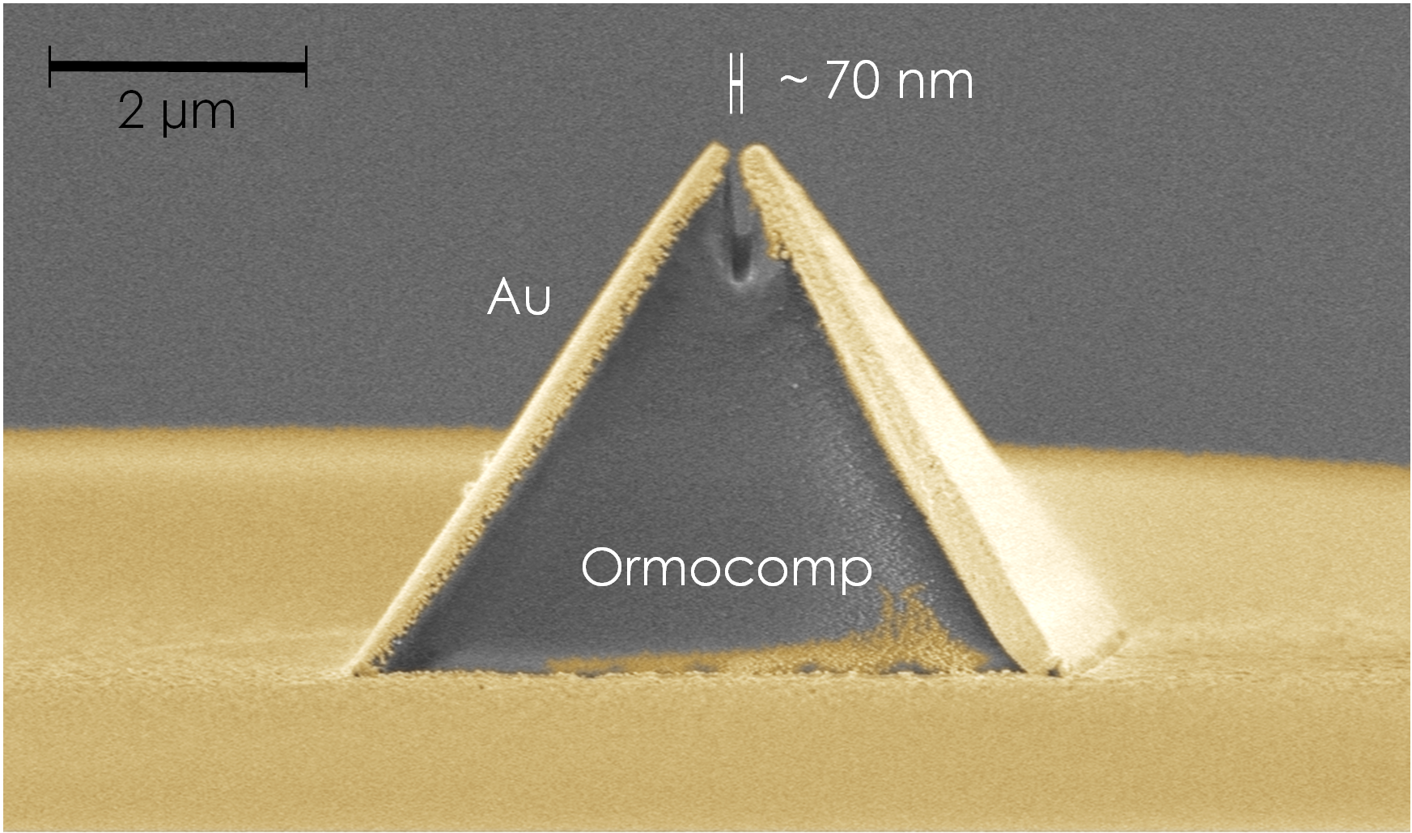
False-color SEM image of the Campanile near-field probe fabricated on the edge of an optical fiber using nanoimprint.

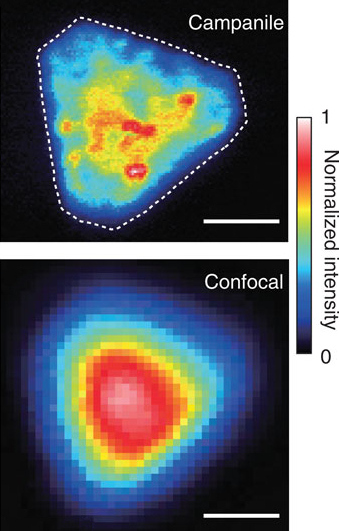
Comparison of photoluminescence maps recorded from a molybdenum disulfide flake using a campanile probe (top) and conventional confocal microscopy (bottom). Scale bars: 1 μm.

In near-field scanning optical microscopy the campanile probe is a tapered optical probe with a shape of a campanile (a square pyramid). It is made of an optically transparent dielectric, typically silica, and its two facets are coated with a metal, typically gold. At the probe tip, the metal-coated facets are separated by a gap of a few tens of nanometers, which determines the spatial resolution of the probe. Such a probe design allows collecting optical signals, usually photoluminescence (PL) or Raman scattering, with a subwavelength resolution, breaking the diffraction limit.

The campanile probe is attached to an optical fiber, which both provides a laser excitation of the studied sample and collects the measured signal. The probe is rastered over the sample with a standard scanning probe microscopy scanner, keeping the distance to the sample surface at a few nanometers. Contrary to the traditional (circular) near-field probes, the campanile probe has no cut-off frequency and is insensitive to the spatial mode of the optical near field. Hence its application is not limited to thin-film samples. Another advantage of the campanile probe is a high signal collection efficiency, which exceeds 90%.

Campanile probes are typically fabricated as follows: a standard cylindrical single-mode optical fiber is etched with hydrofluoric acid to create a conical tip with a radius of ca. 100 nm. Then a square pyramid is carved on the tip using focused ion beam (FIB) milling, and its two facets are coated with a metal by shadow evaporation. A nanometer gap is then opened on the tip by FIB. Alternative fabrication method uses nanoimprint lithography to replicate campanile pyramid from a mold. This approach significantly increases fabrication speed.
