= Dirk Dubbers =

German physicist

Dirk Dubbers (short for Dietrich Jochen Dubbers) (born 16 November 1943 in Dresden) is a German physicist.

== Biography ==
Dubbers studied physics at the universities of Göttingen and Heidelberg, received his doctorate in 1972 in Heidelberg, then worked from 1972 to 1975 at the European neutron source of the Institut Laue–Langevin, Grenoble, France in the field of nuclear condensed matter physics, and habilitated 1978 in Heidelberg. From 1985 to 1990 he was senior scientist at ILL and investigated the role of neutrons in particle physics and cosmology. 1991 followed a professorship at the Technical University of Munich. In 1993 he became full professor for experimental physics at Heidelberg University. From 1998 to 2001 Dirk Dubbers was the director of ILL, from 2001 to 2003 the dean of The Faculty of Physics and Astronomy in Heidelberg, and emeritus since 2011.

== Distinctions and awards ==
- 1991 Stern-Gerlach Medal of the Deutsche Physikalische Gesellschaft, together with Walter Mampe from ILL.
- 2012 honorary doctor, Vienna University of Technology.

== Publications ==
- Dubbers, Dirk; Stöckmann, Hans-Jürgen (2013). "Quantum Physics: The Bottom-Up Approach". Graduate Texts in Physics. Berlin, Heidelberg: Springer Berlin Heidelberg. doi:10.1007/978-3-642-31060-7. ISBN 978-3-642-31059-1. ISSN 1868-4513.
- Dubbers, Dirk; Schmidt, Michael G. (24 October 2011). "The neutron and its role in cosmology and particle physics". Reviews of Modern Physics. 83 (4). American Physical Society (APS): 1111–1171. arXiv:1105.3694. Bibcode:2011RvMP...83.1111D. doi:10.1103/revmodphys.83.1111. ISSN 0034-6861. S2CID 119222013.
