= Friedrich Wagner =

German physicist and emeritus professor (born 1943)

- Born: Friedrich E. Wagner; November 16, 1943 (age 82); Bavaria, Germany
- Education: Technical University of Munich (Ph.D.)
- Known for: H-mode in fusion plasmas
- Awards: John Dawson Award (1987); Hannes Alfvén Prize (2007); Stern–Gerlach Medal (2009)
- Scientific career
- Fields: Plasma physics
- Workplaces: Max Planck Institute for Plasma Physics
- Thesis: (1972)
- Website: www.ipp.mpg.de/63699/wagner

Friedrich E. Wagner (born November 16, 1943, sometimes abbreviated as Fritz Wagner) is a German physicist and emeritus professor who specializes in plasma physics. He was known to have discovered the high-confinement mode (i.e. H-mode) of magnetic confinement in fusion plasmas while working at the ASDEX tokamak in 1982. For this discovery and his subsequent contributions to fusion research, was awarded the John Dawson Award in 1987, the Hannes Alfvén Prize in 2007 and the Stern–Gerlach Medal in 2009.

== Life and career ==
Wagner was born in Pfaffenhofen an der Roth in Bavaria, Germany. He studied at the Technical University of Munich and completed his doctorate in 1972. He then worked at Ohio State University from 1973 to 1974. At first, he worked on low-temperature physics, but switched to plasma fusion research during the energy crisis of the time. In 1975, he started working for the Max Planck Institute for Plasma Physics, and in 1986 he led the tokamak experiment ASDEX.

In 1988, Wagner habilitated at Heidelberg University and was given a teaching position there. He was then appointed honorary professor at the Technical University of Munich. From 1989 to 1993, Wagner was project manager of the Wendelstein 7-AS stellarator experiment.

In 1993, he became the director of the Max Planck Institute for Plasma Physics and was Chairman of the Plasma Physics Department of the European Physical Society between 1996 and 2004. In 1999, he became full professor at the Ernst Moritz Arndt University in Greifswald. From 2003 to 2005, he was head of the Wendelstein 7-X experiment. He retired in 2008.

He was President of the European Physical Society between 2007 and 2009.

== Honors and awards ==
Wagner is an honorary member of the Ioffe Institute at St. Petersburg and a fellow of the Institute of Physics and the American Physical Society.

In 1987, Wagner was awarded the John Dawson Award for Excellence in Plasma Physics Research from the American Physical Society.

In 2007, he received the Hannes Alfvén Prize from the European Physical Society for his contributions to fusion research by magnetic confinement.

In 2009, he received the Stern–Gerlach Medal, the highest honour for experimental physics awarded by the German Physical Society. He was awarded in honor of his work in high-temperature plasma physics and fusion research, especially for the discovery of self-organizing transport barriers (i.e. H-mode), which was groundbreaking for the mastery of fusion plasmas.

== Publications ==
- Wagner, F.; Fussmann, G.; Grave, T.; Keilhacker, M.; Kornherr, M.; Lackner, K.; McCormick, K.; Müller, E. R.; Stäbler, A.; Becker, G.; Bernhardi, K. (1984). "Development of an Edge Transport Barrier at the H-Mode Transition of ASDEX". Physical Review Letters. 53 (15): 1453–1456. Bibcode:1984PhRvL..53.1453W. doi:10.1103/PhysRevLett.53.1453. ISSN 0031-9007.
- Wagner, F.; Gruber, O.; Lackner, K.; Murmann, H. D.; Speth, E.; Becker, G.; Bosch, H. S.; Brocken, H.; Cattanei, G.; Dorst, D.; Eberhagen, A. (1986). "Experimental Study of the Principles Governing Tokamak Transport". Physical Review Letters. 56 (20): 2187–2190. Bibcode:1986PhRvL..56.2187W. doi:10.1103/PhysRevLett.56.2187. PMID 10032913.
- Wagner, F; Stroth, U (1993). "Transport in toroidal devices-the experimentalist's view". Plasma Physics and Controlled Fusion. 35 (10): 1321–1371. Bibcode:1993PPCF...35.1321W. doi:10.1088/0741-3335/35/10/002. ISSN 0741-3335.
- Wagner, F.; Bäumel, S.; Baldzuhn, J.; Basse, N.; Brakel, R.; Burhenn, R.; Dinklage, A.; Dorst, D.; Ehmler, H.; Endler, M.; Erckmann, V. (2005). "W7-AS: One step of the Wendelstein stellarator line". Physics of Plasmas. 12 (7): 072509. Bibcode:2005PhPl...12g2509W. doi:10.1063/1.1927100. ISSN 1070-664X.
- Wagner, F (2007). "A quarter-century of H-mode studies". Plasma Physics and Controlled Fusion. 49 (12B): B1–B33. Bibcode:2007PPCF...49....1W. doi:10.1088/0741-3335/49/12b/s01. ISSN 0741-3335.
- Wagner, Friedrich E. (2012). "Rudolf Mössbauer and the development of the Garching research site". Hyperfine Interactions. 204 (1–3): 83–88. Bibcode:2012HyInt.204...83W. doi:10.1007/s10751-012-0567-x. ISSN 0304-3843. S2CID 96585034.
