= Stern–Gerlach Medal =

The Stern–Gerlach Medal is the most prestigious prize for experimental physicists awarded by the German Physical Society. It is named after the scientists of the Stern–Gerlach experiment, Otto Stern and Walther Gerlach. It was originally called the Stern–Gerlach Prize, and has been awarded annually since 1988. It was converted into a medal in 1992.

The highest award of the German Physical Society for theoretical physics is the Max Planck Medal.

== Laureates ==
- 1988 Erich Gerdau
- 1989 Manfred Faubel
- 1990 Horst Uwe Keller (Max-Planck-Institut für Sonnensystemforschung, Katlenburg-Lindau)
- 1991 Dirk Dubbers und Walter Mampe
- 1992 Wolfgang Krätschmer
- 1993 Klaus Winter
- 1994 Wolfgang Kaiser
- 1995 Joachim Trümper
- 1996 Heinz Maier-Leibnitz
- 1997 Peter Armbruster
- 1998 Herbert Walther
- 1999 Siegfried Hunklinger
- 2000 Theodor W. Hänsch
- 2001 Achim Richter
- 2002 Jan Peter Toennies
- 2003 Reinhard Genzel
- 2004 Frank Steglich
- 2005 Bogdan Povh
- 2006 Erich Sackmann
- 2007 Peter Grünberg
- 2008 Konrad Kleinknecht
- 2009 Friedrich Wagner
- 2010 Horst Schmidt-Böcking
- 2011 Günter Wolf
- 2012 Rainer Blatt
- 2013 Dieter Pohl
- 2014 Gerhard Abstreiter
- 2015 Karl Jakobs
- 2016 Werner Hofmann
- 2017 Laurens Molenkamp
- 2018 Karsten Danzmann
- 2019 Peter Braun-Munzinger, Johanna Stachel
- 2020 Dieter Bimberg
- 2021 Joachim Ullrich
- 2022 Frank Eisenhauer
- 2023 Manfred Fiebig
- 2024 Immanuel Bloch
- 2025 Klaus Blaum

== See also ==
- List of physics awards
