= Karl Jakobs =

German physicist

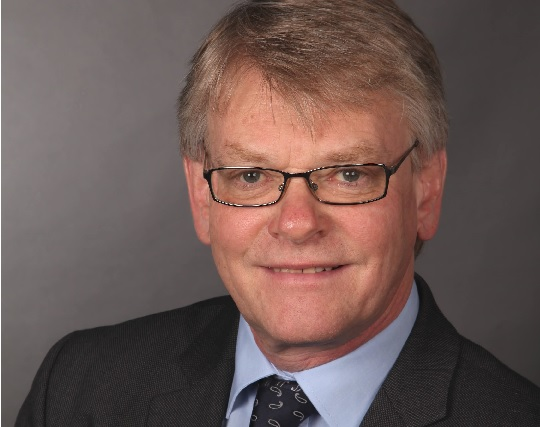
- Education: University of Bonn (Diplom); Heidelberg University (PhD)
- Awards: Stern-Gerlach-Medaille (2015)
- Scientific career
- Fields: Particle physics; ATLAS experiment
- Workplaces: CERN; University of Freiburg
- Website: www.particles.uni-freiburg.de

Karl Jakobs is Professor of Particle Physics at the University of Freiburg, Germany. He was the Spokesperson (scientific head) of the ATLAS Collaboration at the Large Hadron Collider at CERN from 2017 to 2021.

== Education ==
Jakobs studied at the University of Bonn and received his Diplom in 1984. He went to the Heidelberg University to study the properties of the production of W and Z bosons in proton-proton collisions and received his PhD in 1988.

== Awards ==
In 2015 Karl Jakobs was awarded the Stern–Gerlach Medal for his contributions to the discovery of the Higgs boson.
