= Near-field scanning optical microscope =

Microscopy technique

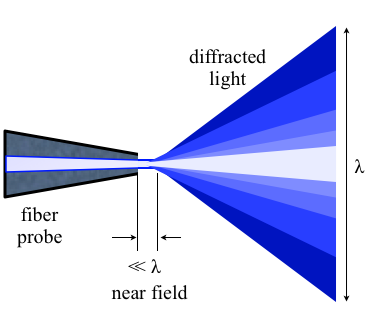
Diagram illustrating near-field optics, with the diffraction of light coming from NSOM fiber probe, showing wavelength of light and the near-field.

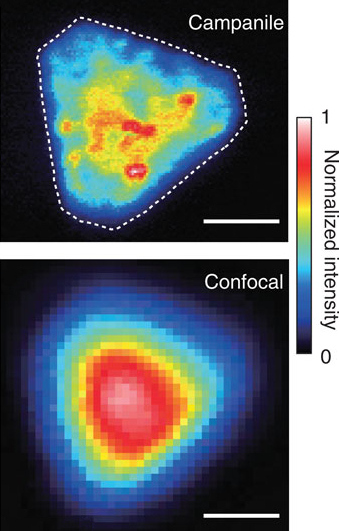
Comparison of photoluminescence maps recorded from a molybdenum disulfide flake using NSOM with a campanile probe (top) and conventional confocal microscopy (bottom). Scale bars: 1 μm.

Near-field scanning optical microscopy (NSOM) or scanning near-field optical microscopy (SNOM) is a microscopy technique for nanostructure investigation that breaks the far field resolution limit by exploiting the properties of evanescent waves. In SNOM, the excitation laser light is focused through an aperture with a diameter smaller than the excitation wavelength, resulting in an evanescent field (or near-field) on the far side of the aperture. When the sample is scanned at a small distance below the aperture, the optical resolution of transmitted or reflected light is limited only by the diameter of the aperture. In particular, lateral resolution of 6 nm and vertical resolution of 2–5 nm have been demonstrated.

As in optical microscopy, the contrast mechanism can be easily adapted to study different properties, such as refractive index, chemical structure and local stress. Dynamic properties can also be studied at a sub-wavelength scale using this technique.

NSOM/SNOM is a form of scanning probe microscopy.

== History ==
Edward Hutchinson Synge is given credit for conceiving and developing the idea for an imaging instrument that would image by exciting and collecting diffraction in the near field. His original idea, proposed in 1928, was based upon the usage of intense nearly planar light from an arc under pressure behind a thin, opaque metal film with a small orifice of about 100 nm. The orifice was to remain within 100 nm of the surface, and information was to be collected by point-by-point scanning. He foresaw the illumination and the detector movement being the biggest technical difficulties. John A. O'Keefe also developed similar theories in 1956. He thought the moving of the pinhole or the detector when it is so close to the sample would be the most likely issue that could prevent the realization of such an instrument. It was Ash and Nicholls at University College London who, in 1972, first broke the Abbe's diffraction limit using microwave radiation with a wavelength of 3 cm. A line grating was resolved with a resolution of λ_{0}/60. A decade later, a patent on an optical near-field microscope was filed by Dieter Pohl, followed in 1984 by the first paper that used visible radiation for near field scanning. The near-field optical (NFO) microscope involved a sub-wavelength aperture at the apex of a metal coated sharply pointed transparent tip, and a feedback mechanism to maintain a constant distance of a few nanometers between the sample and the probe. Lewis et al. were also aware of the potential of an NFO microscope at this time. They reported first results in 1986 confirming super-resolution. In both experiments, details below 50 nm (about λ_{0}/10) in size could be recognized.

== Theory ==
According to Abbe's theory of image formation, developed in 1873, the resolving capability of an optical component is ultimately limited by the spreading out of each image point due to diffraction. Unless the aperture of the optical component is large enough to collect all the diffracted light, the finer aspects of the image will not correspond exactly to the object. The minimum resolution (d) for the optical component is thus limited by its aperture size, and expressed by the Rayleigh criterion:

$$d = 0.61 \frac{\lambda_0}{N\!A} \;\!$$

Here, λ_{0} is the wavelength in vacuum; NA is the numerical aperture for the optical component (maximum 1.3–1.4 for modern objectives with a very high magnification factor). Thus, the resolution limit is usually around λ_{0}/2 for conventional optical microscopy.

This treatment takes into account only the light diffracted into the far-field that propagates without any restrictions. NSOM makes use of evanescent or non propagating fields that exist only near the surface of the object. These fields carry the high frequency spatial information about the object and have intensities that drop off exponentially with distance from the object. Because of this, the detector must be placed very close to the sample in the near field zone, typically a few nanometers. As a result, near field microscopy remains primarily a surface inspection technique. The detector is then rastered across the sample using a piezoelectric stage. The scanning can either be done at a constant height or with regulated height by using a feedback mechanism.

== Modes of operation ==
=== Aperture and apertureless operation ===
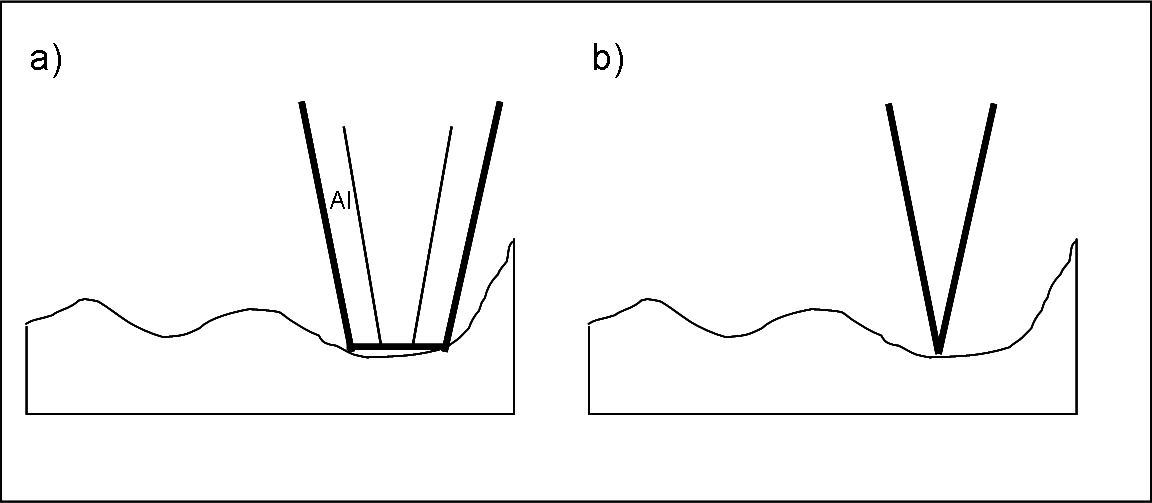
Sketch of a) typical metal-coated tip, and b) sharp uncoated tip.

There exist NSOM which can be operated in so-called aperture mode and NSOM for operation in a non-aperture mode. As illustrated, the tips used in the apertureless mode are very sharp and do not have a metal coating.

Though there are many issues associated with the apertured tips (heating, artifacts, contrast, sensitivity, topology and interference among others), aperture mode remains more popular. This is primarily because apertureless mode is even more complex to set up and operate, and is not understood as well. There are five primary modes of apertured NSOM operation and four primary modes of apertureless NSOM operation. The major ones are illustrated in the next figure.

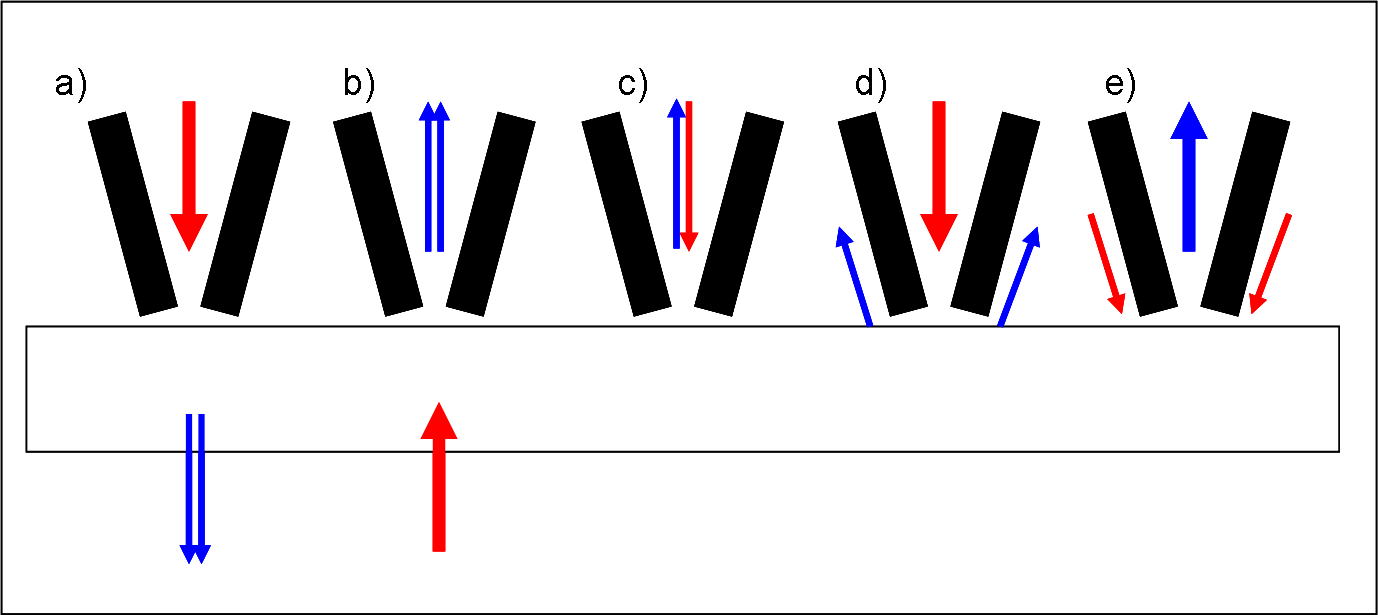
Apertured modes of operation: a) illumination, b) collection, c) illumination collection, d) reflection and e) reflection collection.

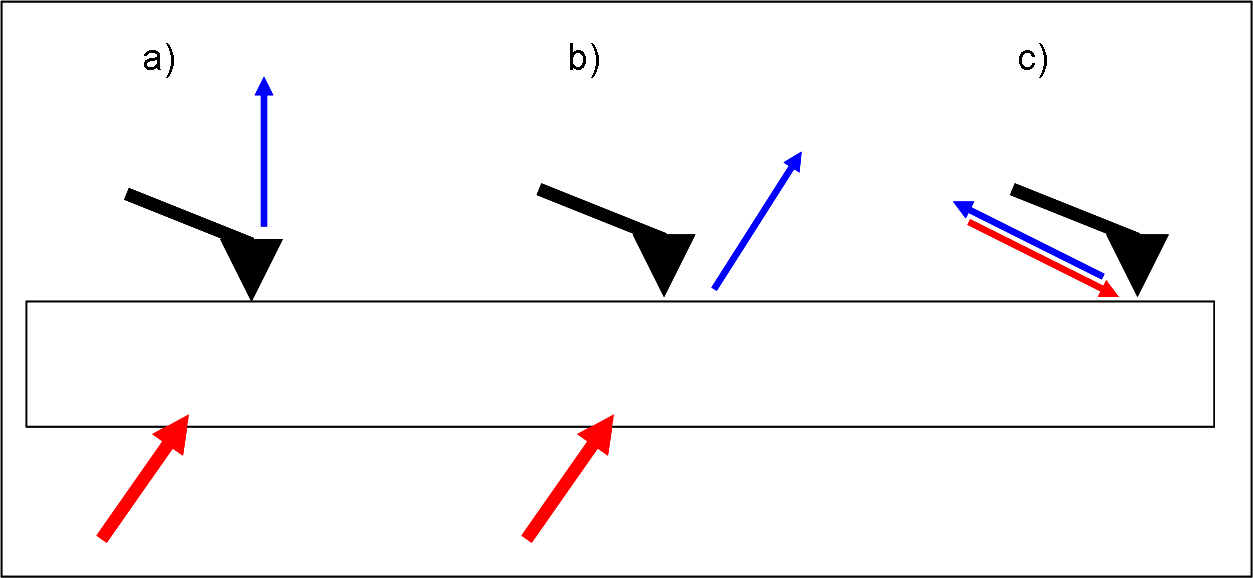
Apertureless modes of operation: a) photon tunneling (PSTM) by a sharp transparent tip, b) PSTM by sharp opaque tip on smooth surface, and c) scanning interferometric apertureless microscopy with double modulation.

Some types of NSOM operation utilize a campanile probe, which has a square pyramid shape with two facets coated with a metal. Such a probe has a high signal collection efficiency (>90%) and no frequency cutoff. Another alternative is "active tip" schemes, where the tip is functionalized with active light sources such as a fluorescent dye or even a light emitting diode that enables fluorescence excitation.

The merits of aperture and apertureless NSOM configurations can be merged in a hybrid probe design, which contains a metallic tip attached to the side of a tapered optical fiber. At visible range (400 nm to 900 nm), about 50% of the incident light can be focused to the tip apex, which is around 5 nm in radius. This hybrid probe can deliver the excitation light through the fiber to realize tip-enhanced Raman spectroscopy (TERS) at tip apex, and collect the Raman signals through the same fiber. The lens-free fiber-in-fiber-out STM-NSOM-TERS has been demonstrated.

=== Feedback mechanisms ===
Feedback mechanisms are usually used to achieve high resolution and artifact free images since the tip must be positioned within a few nanometers of the surfaces. Some of these mechanisms are constant force feedback and shear force feedback

Constant force feedback mode is similar to the feedback mechanism used in atomic force microscopy (AFM). Experiments can be performed in contact, intermittent contact, and non-contact modes.

In shear force feedback mode, a tuning fork is mounted alongside the tip and made to oscillate at its resonance frequency. The amplitude is closely related to the tip-surface distance, and thus used as a feedback mechanism.

=== Contrast ===
It is possible to take advantage of the various contrast techniques available to optical microscopy through NSOM but with much higher resolution. By using the change in the polarization of light or the intensity of the light as a function of the incident wavelength, it is possible to make use of contrast enhancing techniques such as staining, fluorescence, phase contrast and differential interference contrast. It is also possible to provide contrast using the change in refractive index, reflectivity, local stress and magnetic properties amongst others.

== Instrumentation and standard setup ==
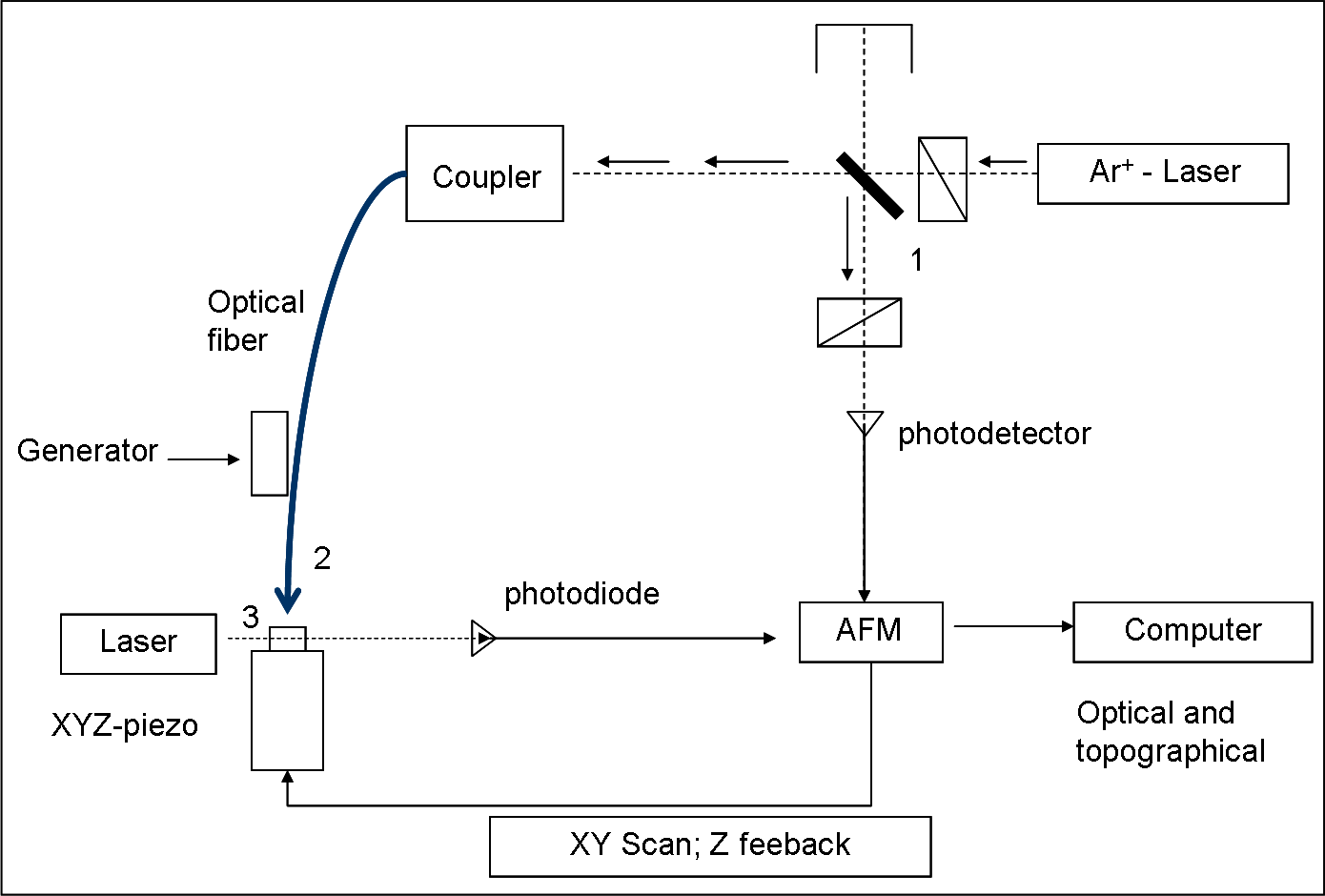
Block diagram of an apertureless reflection-back-to-the-fiber NSOM setup with shear-force distance control and cross-polarization; 1: beam splitter and crossed polarizers; 2: shear-force arrangement; 3: sample mount on a piezo stage.

The primary components of an NSOM setup are the light source, feedback mechanism, the scanning tip, the detector and the piezoelectric sample stage. The light source is usually a laser focused into an optical fiber through a polarizer, a beam splitter and a coupler. The polarizer and the beam splitter would serve to remove stray light from the returning reflected light. The scanning tip, depending upon the operation mode, is usually a pulled or stretched optical fiber coated with metal except at the tip or just a standard AFM cantilever with a hole in the center of the pyramidal tip. Standard optical detectors, such as avalanche photodiode, photomultiplier tube (PMT) or CCD, can be used. Highly specialized NSOM techniques, Raman NSOM for example, have much more stringent detector requirements.

== Near-field spectroscopy ==
As the name implies, information is collected by spectroscopic means instead of imaging in the near field regime. Through near field spectroscopy (NFS), one can probe spectroscopically with sub-wavelength resolution. Raman SNOM and fluorescence SNOM are two of the most popular NFS techniques as they allow for the identification of nanosized features with chemical contrast. Some of the common near-field spectroscopic techniques are below.

Direct local Raman NSOM is based on Raman spectroscopy. Aperture Raman NSOM is limited by very hot and blunt tips, and by long collection times. However, apertureless NSOM can be used to achieve high Raman scattering efficiency factors (around 40). Topological artifacts make it hard to implement this technique for rough surfaces.

Tip-enhanced Raman spectroscopy (TERS) is an offshoot of surface enhanced Raman spectroscopy (SERS). This technique can be used in an apertureless shear-force NSOM setup, or by using an AFM tip coated with gold or silver. The Raman signal is found to be significantly enhanced under the AFM tip. This technique has been used to give local variations in the Raman spectra under a single-walled nanotube. A highly sensitive optoacoustic spectrometer must be used for the detection of the Raman signal.

Fluorescence NSOM is a highly popular and sensitive technique which makes use of fluorescence for near field imaging, and is especially suited for biological applications. The technique of choice here is apertureless back to the fiber emission in constant shear force mode. This technique uses merocyanine-based dyes embedded in an appropriate resin. Edge filters are used for removal of all primary laser light. Resolution as low as 10 nm can be achieved using this technique.

Near field infrared spectrometry and near-field dielectric microscopy use near-field probes to combine sub-micron microscopy with localized IR spectroscopy.

The nano-FTIR method is a broadband nanoscale spectroscopy that combines apertureless NSOM with broadband illumination and FTIR detection to obtain a complete infrared spectrum at every spatial location. Sensitivity to a single molecular complex and nanoscale resolution up to 10 nm has been demonstrated with nano-FTIR.

The nanofocusing technique can create a nanometer-scale "white" light source at the tip apex, which can be used to illuminate a sample at near-field for spectroscopic analysis. The interband optical transitions in individual single-walled carbon nanotubes are imaged and a spatial resolution around 6 nm has been reported.

== Artifacts ==
NSOM can be vulnerable to artifacts that are not from the intended contrast mode. The most common root for artifacts in NSOM are tip breakage during scanning, striped contrast, displaced optical contrast, local far field light concentration, and topographic artifacts.

In apertureless NSOM, also known as scattering-type SNOM or s-SNOM, many of these artifacts are eliminated or can be avoided by proper technique application.

== Limitations ==
One limitation is a very short working distance and extremely shallow depth of field. It is normally limited to surface studies; however, it can be applied for subsurface investigations within the corresponding depth of field. In shear force mode and other contact operation it is not conducive for studying soft materials. It has long scan times for large sample areas for high resolution imaging.

An additional limitation is the predominant orientation of the polarization state of the interrogating light in the near-field of the scanning tip. Metallic scanning tips naturally orient the polarization state perpendicular to the sample surface. Other techniques, like anisotropic terahertz microspectroscopy utilize in-plane polarimetry to study physical properties inaccessible to near-field scanning optical microscopes including the spatial dependence of intramolecular vibrations in anisotropic molecules.

== See also ==
- Fluorescence spectroscopy
- Nano-optics
- Near-field optics
