= Stefan Ulmer (physicist) =

Particle physicist

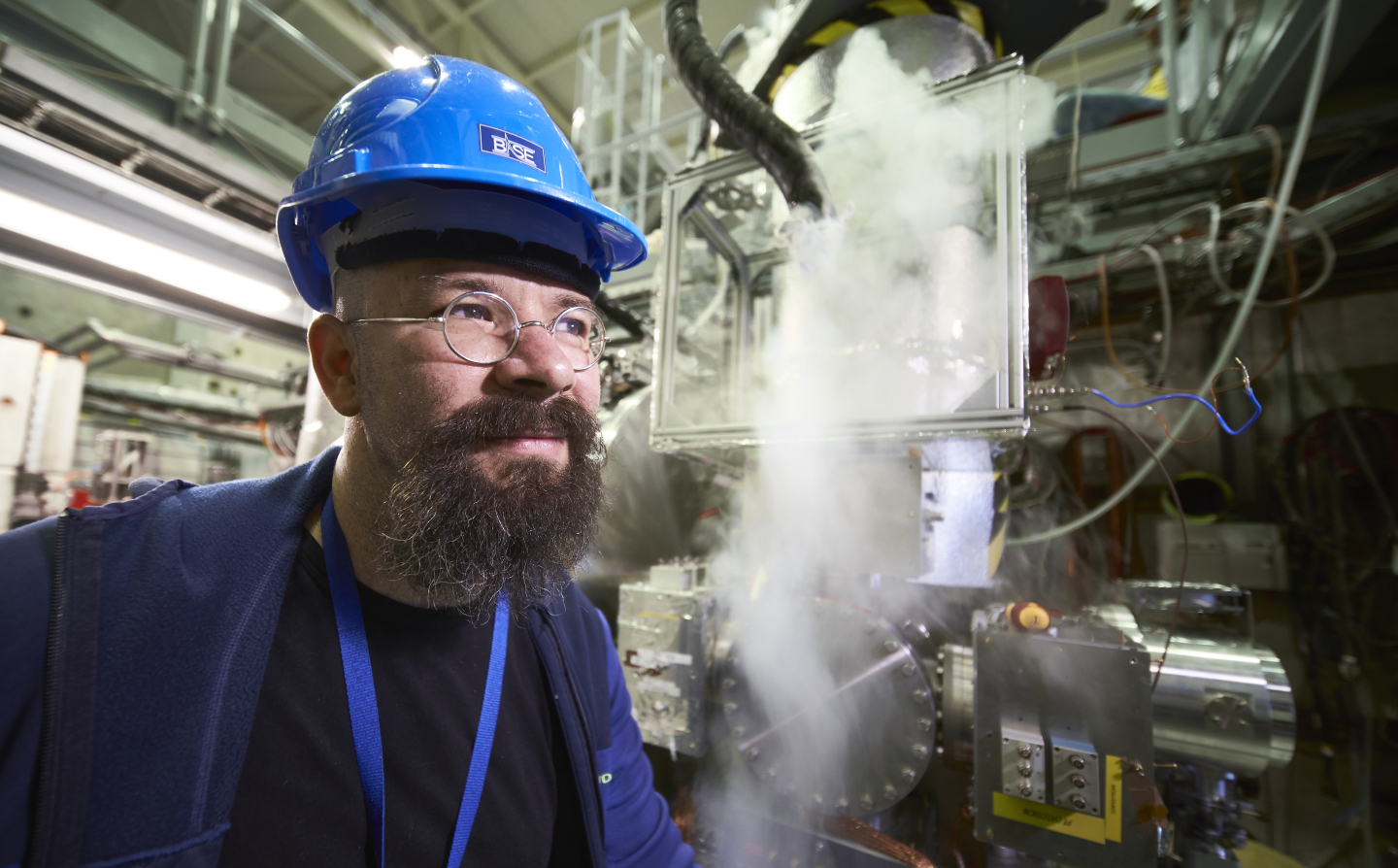
Stefan Ulmer at BASE Collaboration, CERN

Stefan Ulmer (born 1977 in Tübingen) is a particle physicist, professor of Physics at Heinrich Heine University Düsseldorf and chief scientist at the Ulmer Fundamental Symmetries Laboratory, RIKEN, Tokyo. He is the founder and the spokesperson of the BASE experiment (AD-8) at the Antiproton Decelerator facility at CERN, Geneva. Stefan Ulmer is well known for his contributions to improving Penning trap techniques and precision measurements on antimatter. He is the first person to observe spin transitions with a single trapped proton as well as single spin transitions with a single trapped antiproton, a significant achievement towards a precision measurement of the antiproton magnetic moment.

Stefan Ulmer completed his Ph.D. thesis from the Heidelberg University, Germany, under the supervision Wolfgang Quint and Klaus Blaum in 2011. Ulmer's studies focused on the first observation of spin flips with a single proton stored in a cryogenic Penning trap. In 2012 he was promoted to a PI position at RIKEN, Japan, and in 2019 he became co-director of a MPG, RIKEN, PTB center for time, constants, and fundamental symmetries.

== Research ==
After his Ph.D. studies, Stefan Ulmer joined the ASACUSA CUSP experiment at CERN in 2012 as a postdoctorate fellow, and contributed to the production of the first polarized beam of antihydrogen atoms. Simultaneously, he worked on setting up the BASE experiment. He invented a reservoir trap technique that allowed BASE to store antiprotons for about 400 days. In 2014, Stefan Ulmer's team performed the most precise measurement of the proton-antiproton charge-to-mass ratio, evidently the most accurate test of CPT invariance of baryons. In 2017, his team reported the first observation of single antiproton spin transitions, and also completed the most precise measurements of antiproton magnetic moment. From a time-base analysis of these data the most stringent limits on dark-matter / antimatter coupling were derived. Inspired by this work, the BASE collaboration has used Penning trap detection systems as axion haloscopes, to set competitive limits on axion-to-photon conversion. In 2022 Ulmer's team reported on a comparison of the proton/antiproton charge-to-mass ratio with a fractional accuracy of 16 parts in a trillion, currently the most precise test of matter/antimatter symmetry with baryons. This measurement also constitutes the first differential test of the clock weak equivalence principle with antiprotons. In 2025, the BASE team demonstrated the implementation of the first antimatter qubit and coherent spectroscopy with a single antiproton spin, an achievement listed as a top-10 physics breakthrough of 2025. On the 24th of March 2026, Ulmer and team reported on the first ever demonstrated transport of antimatter particles - antiprotons - in the transportable cryogenic Penning trap system BASE-STEP. Ulmer's measurements are considered to be outstanding and of great value for fundamental physics research.

== Awards and recognition ==
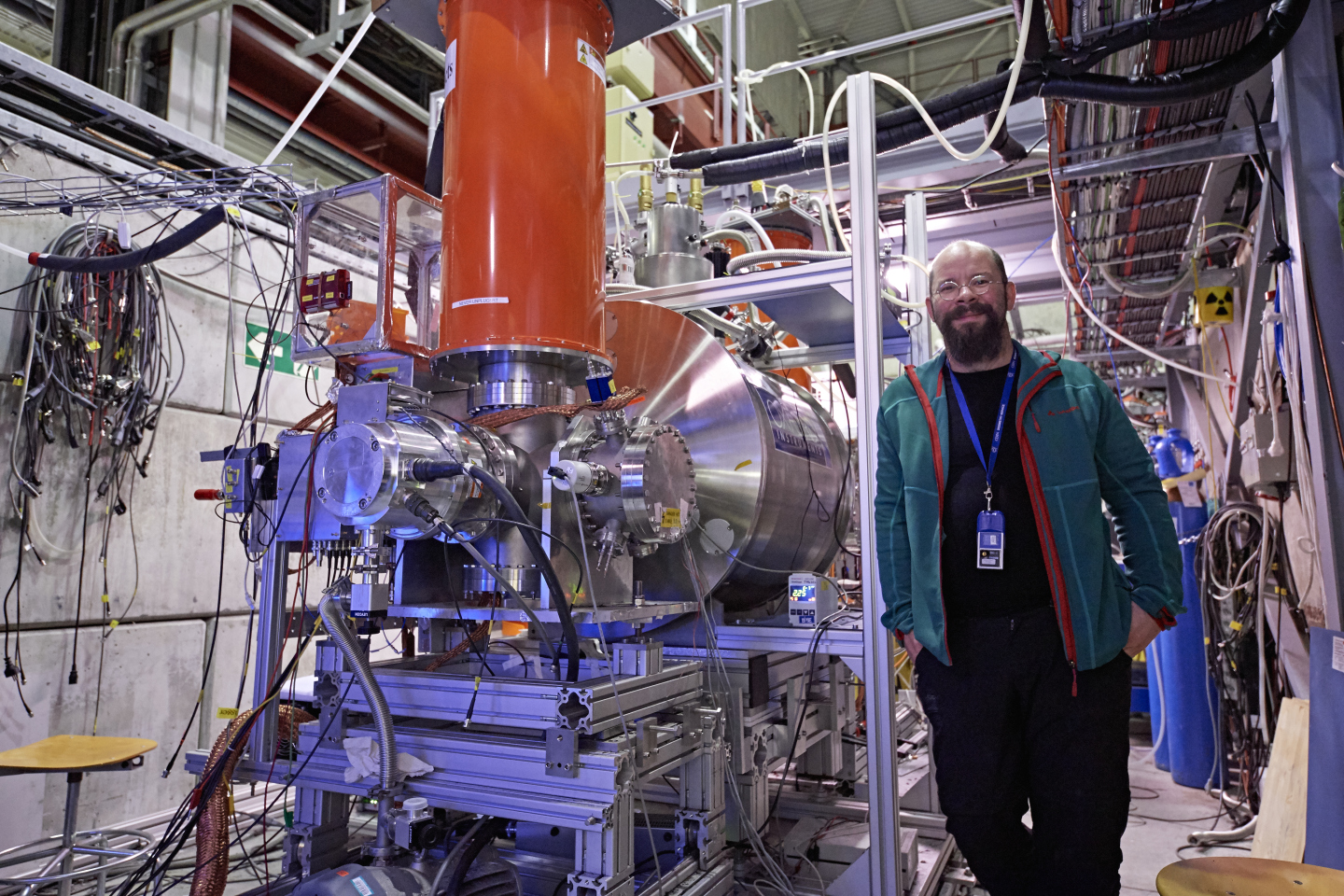
Stefan Ulmer at the BASE experimental setup

Stefan Ulmer has received the following awards and recognition for his contributions to fundamental experimental physics.

1. Falling Walls Award in the Physical Sciences 2022
2. He was elected as chairperson and official representative of the antimatter physics community of CERN in 2018.
3. International Union of Pure and Applied Physics (IUPAP) young scientist award in fundamental metrology, 2014, for his work on the high-precision comparisons of the fundamental properties of the protons and the antiprotons.
