= Bogdan Povh =

Slovene-German physicist

- Born: 20 August 1932
- Died: 20 February 2024 (aged 91)
- Education: California Institute of Technology
- Scientific career
- Fields: Nuclear physics; Particle physics
- Workplaces: Max Planck Institute for Nuclear Physics

Bogdan Povh (20 August 1932 – 14 February 2024) was a Slovene-German physicist.

== Biography ==
Povh studied physics at the University of Ljubljana, graduating in 1955. He then worked at Jožef Stefan Institute. From 1957 to 1959 he joined the group of the later Nobel laureate William A. Fowler at California Institute of Technology before completing his doctorate in 1960.

In Summer 1962 he moved to Freiburg, Germany. In 1965 Povh was appointed to the University of Heidelberg. In 1972 he became an External Scientific Member of the Max Planck Institute for Nuclear Physics, and a Scientific Member in 1975. Povh remained there until his retirement in 2000. From 1985 to 1987 he was the institute's managing director. He carried out experiments at CERN, DESY and Fermilab. In 2005 he received the Stern-Gerlach Medal for his research on hypernuclei.

== Distinctions and awards ==
- 2005 Stern-Gerlach Medal of the Deutsche Physikalische Gesellschaft
- 1989 to 1997 editor-in-chief of the Zeitschrift für Physik A
- 1997 to 1999 editor-in-chief of the European Physical Journal A

== Selected publications ==
- Povh, Bogdan; Rith, Klaus; Scholz, Christoph; Zetsche, Frank (1995). Particles and Nuclei: An introduction to the physical concepts. Springer-Verlag. ISBN 978-0-387-59439-2.
- Povh, Bogdan; Rosina, Mitja (2017). Scattering and Structures: Essentials and Analogies in Quantum Physics. Springer-Verlag. ISBN 978-3-662-54513-3.
