= Werner Hofmann (physicist) =

German professor of physics (born 1952)

Werner Hofmann (born November 11, 1952, in Baden-Baden) is a German professor of physics. He is director of the Max Planck Institute for Nuclear Physics in Heidelberg.

== Life and work ==
Hofmann studied physics at the University of Karlsruhe, completing his studies with a doctorate in 1977. In 1980 he wrote his Habilitationsschrift at the University of Dortmund. In 1981 he received a Heisenberg Scholarship and from 1984 to 1987 he worked as assistant and associate professor at the University of California, Berkeley, where he was appointed full professor of physics in 1987. Since 1988 he is director at the Max Planck Institute for Nuclear Physics in Heidelberg. In 1989 he also received an honorary professorship at the University of Heidelberg. Since 2010, he is a member of the Heidelberg Academy of Sciences.

Hofmann's research areas include astroparticle physics, specifically high-energy gamma-ray astrophysics of detectors on the ground; CP violation; physics of heavy quarks; neutrinoless double beta decay; QCD; quark and gluon fragmentation; and physics of jets. He is senior scientist in the High Energy Stereoscopic System (H.E.S.S.) experiment in Namibia.

According to Geoffrey C. Fox, Hofmann's 1981 monograph Jets of Hadrons is "thorough" and "well-written".

== Awards ==
In 2010, he received, with the H.E.S.S. team, the Bruno Rossi Prize. In 2015, he was awarded the Marian Smoluchowski Emil Warburg Prize of the Polish Physical Society and the German Physical Society, as well as the Yodh Prize of the International Union of Pure and Applied Physics (IUPAP). In 2016 he received the Stern–Gerlach Medal.
