= Vartkess Ara Apkarian =

Armenian-American researcher

Vartkess Ara Apkarian (born 1955) is an Armenian-American physical chemist and a Professor of Chemistry at the University of California, Irvine.

== Career ==
He is the Director of Center for Chemistry at the Space-Time Limit, a National Science Foundation Center for Chemical Innovation. He graduated from University of Southern California with B.S. degrees in Chemistry followed by Ph.D. degree in chemistry from Northwestern University. Following a postdoctoral fellowship at Cornell University, he joined the University of California as Chemistry faculty in 1983. He served as the Chair of the Chemistry Department (2004-2007) at UC Irvine.

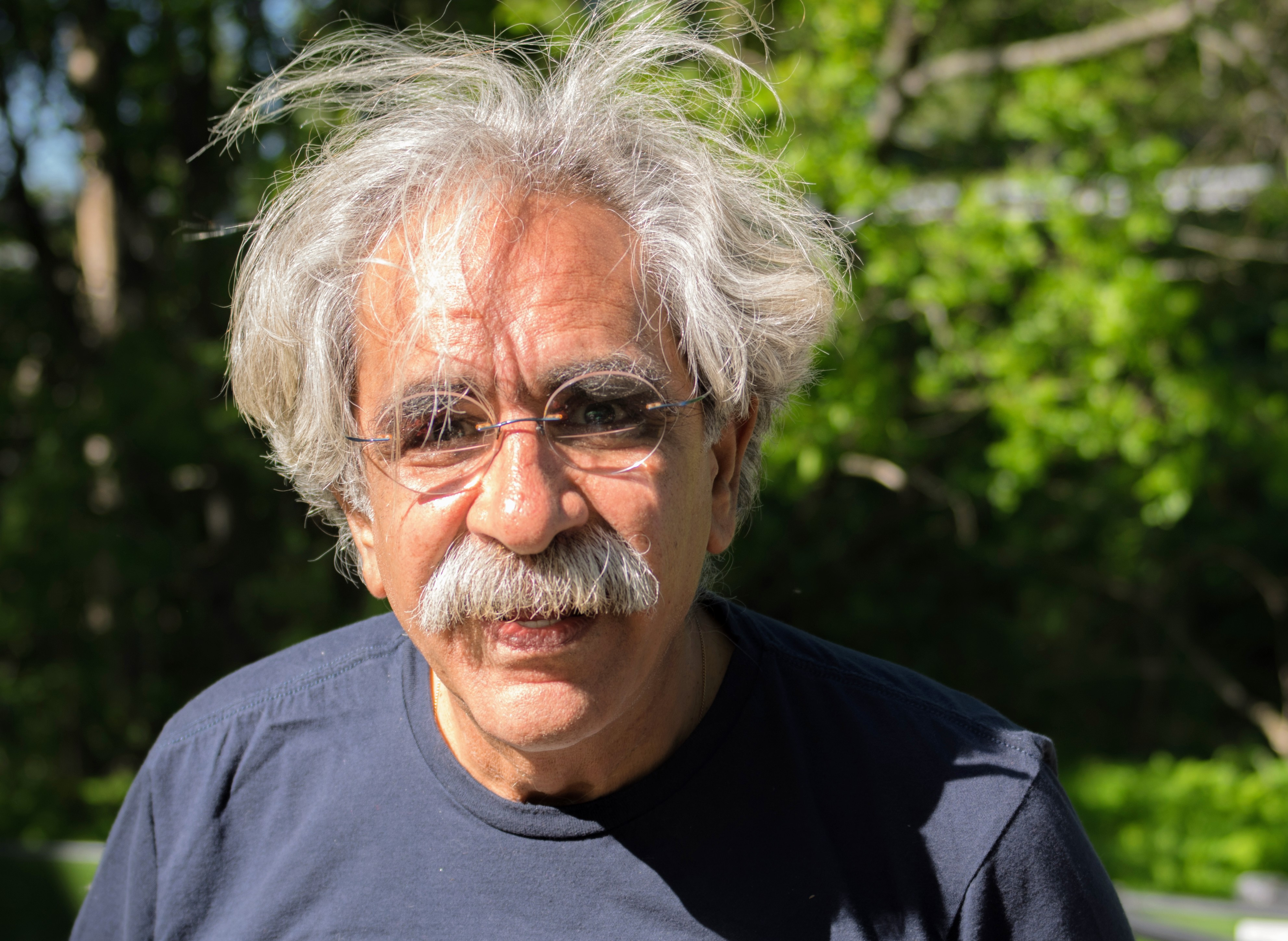
Vartkess Apkarian at CaSTL Annual Meeting

He is a Foreign Member of the National Academy of Sciences of Armenia, and a Fellow of American Physical Society, American Association for the Advancement of Sciences. His teaching and research has been recognized with awards including the Humboldt Prize (1996), USC Distinguished Alumnus (2007), Charles Bennett Service Through Chemistry Award of ACS (2008) ACS Award in Experimental Physical Chemistry (2014), Honorary Doctorate from the University of Jyväskylä, Finland (2016).

His recent scientific contributions include creating a single-molecule sensor and developing tools to confine the light to atomic dimensions. His team visualized the internal structure of single molecules and imaging the normal vibrational modes of single molecules.
