= Ksenja Povh =

Slovenian footballer

Personal information
- Full name: Ksenja Povh
- Date of birth: 26 March 1987 (age 39)
- Place of birth: Novo Mesto, SFR Yugoslavia
- Positions: Defender; midfielder

Senior career*
Years	Team	Apps	(Gls)
2003–	Krka Novo Mesto		
2009–2010	→ Vamos Idaliou		

International career
- Slovenia
- * Club domestic league appearances and goals

Ksenja Povh is a Slovenian footballer currently playing as a midfielder for Krka Novo Mesto in the 1.SŽNL. She has also played for Vamos Idaliou in the Cypriot First Division.

She was a member of the Slovenian national team in the 2011 World Cup qualifying campaign.

== Titles ==
- 6 Slovenian Leagues (2004, 2005, 2007, 2008, 2009, 2011)
- 4 Slovenian Cups (2004, 2006, 2008, 2009)
