= Wolfgang Kaiser (physicist) =

German physicist (1925–2023)

Wolfgang Kaiser (17 July 1925 – 20 October 2023) was a German physicist who worked in the fields of laser and solid-state physics.

== Biography ==
Wolfgang Kaiser was born in Nürnberg on 17 July 1925. He was awarded his doctorate in Erlangen in 1952, worked as scientist at Purdue University, and in 1954, he joined the US Army Signal Corps Engineering Laboratories in Fort Monmouth. From 1957 to 1964, Kaiser worked at Bell Laboratories in Murray Hill. In 1964, he became a professor for experimental physics at the Technical University of Munich, where he performed research on laser physics. Kaiser died on 20 October 2023, at the age of 98.

== Research ==
Kaiser was internationally recognized for his pioneering work on lasers with ultra-short pulses which find many applications in biophysical and chemical equipment. For example, he showed the molecular reactions regarding the photochemistry of bacteriorhodopsin in photosynthesis. He was involved in the development of ruby lasers and discovered the two-photon absorption with C. G. B. Garrett. The two-photon absorption was postulated by Maria Goeppert-Mayer in 1931 and has become an important method for laser spectrometer applications. Furthermore, Kaiser and his colleagues looked at, and simulated Raman scattering, Brillouin scattering, and the duration of existence of phonons in solid-state matter using Raman spectroscopy. Other topics Kaiser worked on include semi-conductors as well as nonlinear optical issues.

== Honors and Fellowships ==
- 1972: Fellow of the American Physical Society
- 1982: Max Born Medal and Prize of the Deutsche Physikalische Gesellschaft (German Physicist Association) and the British Institute of Physics
- 1986: Ellis R. Lippincott Award of the Optical Society of America
- 1994: Stern-Gerlach-Medaille
- 1995: Bavarian Maximilian Order for Science and Art

Wolfgang Kaiser has got multiple honorary doctorates, from the Purdue University and others, and he was a member of the Bayerische Akademie der Wissenschaften (Bavarian Association for Science), the National Academy of Sciences, and the Academia Europaea.

== Publications ==
- Von kurzen zu ultrakurzen Laserpulsen. (About ultra-short laser pulses) In Physikalische Blätter. July 1994, S. 661. doi:10.1002/phbl.19940500711
- Ultrashort Laser Pulses: Generation and Applications, Springer 1993
- Ultrashort Laser Pulses and Applications, Springer 1988
- Der Laser: Grundlagen und neue Ergebnisse, Abhandlungen und Berichte (The laser: General principles and current research), Deutsches Museum 1967

== Literature ==
- Donald Nelson, Robert Collins, Wolfgang Kaiser Bell Labs and the Ruby Laser. In Physics Today. January 2010.
