= Christoph Helmut Keitel =

German physicist

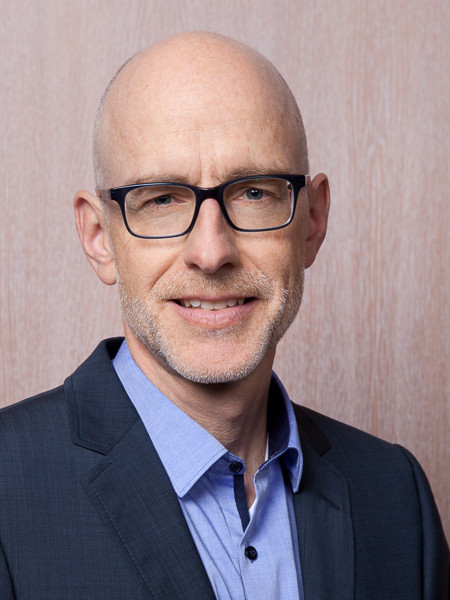
Christoph Helmut Keitel

Christoph Helmut Keitel (born 30 July 1965 in Lübeck, Germany) is a German physicist, presently a director at the Max Planck Institute for Nuclear Physics (Max-Planck-Institut für Kernphysik) in Heidelberg and an honorary professor ("Honorarprofessor") at Heidelberg University.

Christoph H. Keitel studied physics and mathematics at the Leibniz University Hannover and physics at LMU Munich, where he received his doctorate in 1992 after graduating (1990) under Georg Süßmann. After several years of research at the University of New Mexico in Albuquerque and the Imperial College in London, he worked as a Marie Curie Fellow at the University of Innsbruck. In 1998, he became a junior research group leader of a DFG Collaborative Research Centre at the University of Freiburg, where he habilitated in 2000 on Atomic Systems in Intense Laser Fields and obtained the venia legendi.

His teaching activities at the University of Freiburg and Heinrich Heine University Düsseldorf were followed by his admission as a scientific member of the Max Planck Society in 2004 and his appointment as a director at the Max Planck Institute for Nuclear Physics (MPIK) in Heidelberg, serving as the Managing Director of the entire institute from 2006 to 2008 and since 2024 (until 2026). He is the founder and spokesperson of the interdisciplinary International Max Planck Research School Quantum Dynamics in Physics, Chemistry and Biology at MPIK, established in 2007. In 2005, he was appointed honorary professor at the Ruprecht Karls University Heidelberg.

Keitel works primarily in the field of theoretical laser-induced quantum dynamics, quantum electrodynamics and nuclear and high-energy physics with extremely strong laser fields. In the field of high-precision quantum electrodynamics, his team developed theoretical methods for the search for new physics in order to test established theories with unprecedented precision together with experimental colleagues. For the interaction between atomic nuclei and X-ray light, his department succeeded in creating a fundamental understanding of nuclear quantum dynamics, both theoretically and experimentally, as well as in providing new applications for controlling the emitted X-ray light and nuclear excitation (nuclear quantum optics). His work is particularly groundbreaking in the field of physics with extremely strong laser pulses and has opened up new avenues for laser-controlled high-energy physics and laboratory astrophysics.

In 2003, Keitel was honoured with the Gustav-Hertz-Preis of the German Physical Society and in 2023 he was awarded the Willis E. Lamb Prize. Members of his group have received over 20 major awards, including eight Otto Hahn Medals for outstanding doctoral theses. More than 30 of them have since been appointed to professorships worldwide.

== Publications (selected) ==
- Z. Gong, X. Shen, K. Z. Hatsagortsyan, C. H. Keitel, Electron slingshot acceleration in relativistic preturbulent shocks explored via emitted photon polarization, Phys. Rev. Lett. 131, (2023) 225101. A slingshot for electrons in astrophysical plasma shocks
- T. Sailer, V. Debierre, Z. Harman, F. Heiße, C. König, J. Morgner, B. Tu, A. V. Volotka, C. H. Keitel, K. Blaum, S. Sturm, Measurement of the bound-electron g-factor difference in coupled ions, Nature 606, (2022) 479-483. Quantum electrodynamics tested 100 times more accurately
- K. P. Heeg, A. Kaldun, C. Strohm, C. Ott, R. Subramanian, D. Lentrodt, J. Haber, H.-C. Wille, S. Goerttler, R. Rüffer, C. H. Keitel, R. Röhlsberger, T. Pfeifer, J. Evers, Coherent x-ray-optical control of nuclear excitons, Nature 590, (2021) 401-404. Atomic nuclei in the quantum swing
- N. Camus, E. Yakaboylu, L. Fechner, M. Klaiber, M. Laux, Y. Mi, K. Z. Hatsagortsyan, T. Pfeifer, C. H. Keitel, R. Moshammer, Experimental evidence for quantum tunneling time, Phys. Rev. Lett. 119, (2017) 023201. Measuring time in a quantum tunnel
- V. A. Yerokhin, E. Berseneva, Z. Harman, I. I. Tupitsyn, C. H. Keitel, g-factor of light ions for an improved determination of the fine-structure constant, Phys. Rev. Lett. 116, (2016) 100801.
- S. Sturm, F. Köhler, J. Zatorski, A. Wagner, Z. Harman, G. Werth, W. Quint, C. H. Keitel, K. Blaum, High-precision measurement of the atomic mass of the electron, Nature 506, (2014) 467-470.
- M. Klaiber, E. Yakaboylu, H. Bauke, K. Z. Hatsagortsyan, C. H. Keitel, Under-the-barrier dynamics in laser-induced relativistic tunneling, Phys. Rev. Lett. 110, (2013) 153004.
- A. Di Piazza, C. Müller, K. Z. Hatsagortsyan, C. H. Keitel, Extremely high-intensity laser interactions with fundamental quantum systems, Rev. Mod. Phys. 84, (2012) 1177–1228.
- B. King, A. Di Piazza, C. H. Keitel, A matterless double slit, Nature Photonics 4, (2010) 92-94.
- H. Hu, C. Müller, C. H. Keitel, Complete QED Theory of Multiphoton Trident Pair Production in Strong Laser Fields, Phys. Rev. Lett. 105, (2010) 080401.
- T. Bürvenich, J. Evers, C. H. Keitel, Nuclear Quantum Optics with X-Ray Laser Pulses, Phys. Rev. Lett. 96, (2006) 142501.
- M. Fischer, N. Kolachevsky, M. Zimmermann, R. Holzwarth, T. Udem, T. W. Hänsch, M. Abgrall, J. Gruenert, I. Maksimovic, S. Bize, H. Marion, F. Pereira Dos Santos, P. Lemonde, G. Santarelli, P. Laurent, A. Clairon, C. Salomon, M. Haas, U. D. Jentschura, C. H. Keitel, New Limits on the Drift of Fundamental Constants from Laboratory Measurements, Phys. Rev. Lett. 92, (2004) 230802.
- C. H. Keitel, Narrowing Spontaneous Emission without Intensity Reduction, Phys. Rev. Lett. 83, (1999) 1307–1310.
