= Eric Ash =

British electrical engineer (1928–2021)

Professor Sir Eric Ash CBE FRS FREng FIET HonFInstP
- Born: 31 January 1928; Berlin, Germany
- Died: 22 August 2021 (aged 93)
- Education: University College School; Imperial College London
- Awards: Royal Medal (1986); IET Faraday Medal (1980); Marconi Prize (1984); FRS (1977); FREng (1978); EPS Europhysics Prize (1979)
- Scientific career
- Fields: Electronics; Surface acoustic waves Acoustic microscopy
- Workplaces: Imperial College London; University College London; Stanford University
- Thesis: Electron interaction effects (1952)
- Doctoral advisor: Dennis Gabor
- Doctoral students: Kumar Wickramasinghe
- Website: www.imperial.ac.uk/about/introducing-imperial/our-people/our-leaders/sir-eric-a-ash/

Sir Eric Albert Ash (31 January 1928 – 22 August 2021) was a British electrical engineer, past Rector of Imperial College and President of IEE, UK. He was elected an international member of the National Academy of Engineering in 2001 for innovations in optics and acoustics and for leadership in education.

== Early life and education ==
Eric Ash was born Ulrich Asch in Berlin, the son of Dorothea Cecily (Schwarz) and Walter J. Asch, a Jewish lawyer. The family emigrated to England in 1938 to escape Nazism. He was educated at the independent University College School, and at 17 won a scholarship to Imperial College London.

After graduating in electrical engineering, he continued his studies with doctoral research. His PhD supervisor was Dennis Gabor, a Nobel Prize-winning physicist, and his thesis was published as Electron Interaction Effects (1952). He worked on microwave tubes as a Fulbright scholar at Stanford University for two years, before returning to England to continue this work at the Standard Telecommunications Laboratory in London.

== Career and research ==
Ash joined the Department of Electronic and Electrical Engineering at University College in 1963, became a full professor in 1967. He was appointed Head of Department, and holder of the Pender Chair, in 1980. He was elected a Fellow of the Royal Society on 17 March 1977, and was awarded its Clifford Paterson medal shortly afterwards. He was elected a Fellow of the Royal Academy of Engineering in 1978.

He worked on problems in physical electronics, ultrasonic signal processing and imaging. He won the Marconi Prize in 1984 "for leadership in electronic technology, including surface acoustic wave devices and optical fibre communications".

He won the Royal Society Royal Medal in 1986, in "recognition of his outstanding researches on acoustic microscopy leading to wholly new techniques and substantial improvements in resolution of acoustic microscopes". He also won the Institution of Electrical Engineers' Faraday Medal.

He was a Senior Member and Life Fellow of the Institute of Electrical and Electronics Engineers (an organisation based in the United States that complements the IET) and a member of the Academia Europea.

Ash became rector of Imperial College in 1985. He sat on the board of British Telecom as a non-executive director from 1987 to 1993. In 1988, he was president of the IEE for one year. In 1987, he was made an honorary fellow of the Royal Microscopical Society.

After retiring as Rector in 1993, Ash was an emeritus professor in the Department of Physics at University College, 1993–1998, working on educational technology. He acted as CEO of the Student Loans Company 1994–1996, remaining a non-executive director of the company until the end of August 2000.

Ash was treasurer and vice-president of the Royal Society 1997–2002. He has also served as a trustee of a number of other organisations including the Afghan Educational Trust, the Dennis Rosen Memorial Trust, the Royal Institution, the London Science Museum and the Wolfson Foundation. He is a member of the Advisory Council of the Campaign for Science and Engineering and an international member of the National Academy of Engineering.

In 2017, he was elected an Honorary Fellow of the Institute of Physics, UK.

== Death ==
On 22 August 2021, Sir Eric Ash peacefully died at home at the age of 93.

Academic offices
Preceded by Brian Flowers	Rector of Imperial College London; 1985–1993	Succeeded by Ronald Oxburgh
