= Edward Hutchinson Synge =

Irish physicist (1890–1957)

- Born: 1 June 1890; County Dublin, Ireland
- Died: 26 May 1957 (aged 66); Dublin, Ireland
- Education: Trinity College Dublin
- Known for: Theorizing near-field scanning optical microscope
- Scientific career
- Fields: Optics; Microscopy

Edward Hutchinson Synge (1 June 1890 – 26 May 1957) was an Irish physicist who published a complete theoretical description of the near-field scanning optical microscope, an instrument used in nanotechnology, several decades before it was experimentally developed. He never completed university yet did significant original research in both microscopy and telescopy. He was the first to apply the principle of scanning in imaging, which later became important in a wide range of technologies including television, radar, and scanning electron microscopy. He was the older brother of distinguished mathematician and theoretical physicist John Lighton Synge.

== Early life and education ==
Edward Hutchinson Synge was born in 1890, in County Dublin, Ireland, to Edward Synge and Ellen Frances Price. He was familiarly known as "Hutchie". He was the nephew of playwright John Millington Synge and the brother of John Lighton Synge who edited the collected works of Sir William Rowan Hamilton at Hutchie's urging. He and brother John were great-great-great-grandsons of Irish bishop Hugh Hamilton. He is also the uncle of the mathematician Cathleen Synge Morawetz. Throughout his life Synge was very physically active, pursuing walking, cycling, swimming and sailing. In his later life, he took up painting and was good at it.

In 1908 he entered Trinity College Dublin to study Mathematics and old Irish. For three years he was a brilliant student and won several prizes and a Foundation Scholarship in mathematics in 1910. Then at the end of his third year, he came into an inheritance from his uncle John Millington Synge, and in 1913 he dropped out of university.

== Career ==
Starting in 1928, with encouragement from Albert Einstein, Hutchie launched on a period of intense productivity during which he laid the foundation for new kinds of microscopes and telescopes. Nobody, including his famous brother John, appreciated Hutchie's achievements at the time. His work was overlooked for decades, but is now better-known thanks to the book The Life and Works of Edward Hutchinson Synge published by Living Edition in 2012.

On 22 April 1928, Synge wrote to Albert Einstein about an idea he had for a new microscopic imaging method in which an optical field scattered from a tiny gold particle could be used as a radically new light source. Einstein replied that although Synge's method appeared essentially unworkable, the basic ideas seemed correct and he should publish his research.

There followed a remarkable period from 1928 to 1932 in which Synge produced all of his key works which he published in the Dublin Philosophical Magazine and Journal of Science. Remarkably, he did all of this work alone, without a laboratory, and while living at his home in Dundrum in the suburbs of Dublin. By 1932 he had laid out the theory of the near-field microscope and his description was incredibly accurate.

The idea was ahead of its time. In 1956 a similar theory was developed by John A. O'Keefe and in 1972, Ash and Nicholls gave the first experimental demonstration of the technique using electromagnetic radiation. It was not until Synge's original papers re-emerged in the 1980s that his priority was finally recognised.

Synge proposed a design for very large astronomical telescopes, based on multiple mirrors, an idea realised much later in Tucson, Arizona, and elsewhere. He also invented a new kind of remote sensing technique using searchlights. Today this is known as Lidar and uses pulsed lasers.

== Later life ==
According to the people who knew him best, E. H. Synge suffered from what these days would be called Asperger syndrome. Becoming increasingly socially isolated, he dropped out of university in 1913 and worked alone without any support from the academic community until all work stopped in 1932. In 1936 he had a mental breakdown and was committed to a Dublin nursing home where he remained until his death in 1957.

== Publications ==
- A suggested method for extending microscopic resolution into the ultra-microscopic region The London, Edinburgh, and Dublin Philosophical Magazine and Journal of Science, 1928, Series 7, Volume 6, Issue 35, pp. 356–362
- A design for a very large telescope The London, Edinburgh, and Dublin Philosophical Magazine and Journal of Science, 1930, Series 7, Volume 10, Issue 63, pp. 353–360
- A microscopic method The London, Edinburgh, and Dublin Philosophical Magazine and Journal of Science, 1931, Series 7, Volume 11, Issue 68, pp. 65–80
- An application of piezo-electricity to microscopy The London, Edinburgh, and Dublin Philosophical Magazine and Journal of Science, 1932, Series 7, Volume 13, Issue 83, pp. 297–300

== Sources ==
- Hebrew University (2014). Einstein Archives Online: E.H. Synge correspondence The Hebrew University of Jerusalem in co-operation with the Princeton University Press, launched on 5 December 2014
- Trinity College Dublin (April 2012). From peering at atoms to gazing at the stars Trinity College Dublin, 19 April 2012
- Trinity College Dublin (March 2012). Hutchinson Synge – A Nanoscience Visionary Trinity College Dublin, 30 March 2012
- Donegan, J.F. (2012). Hutchie: The Life and Works of Edward Hutchinson Synge (co-edited with D. Weaire and P. Florides), Pöllauberg, Austria : Living Edition, ISBN 3901585176
- Novotny, Lukas (2011). From near-field optics to optical antennas by Lukas Novotny, Physics Today, July 2011, pp. 47–52
- Dublin Graduate Physics Programme (2012). Edward Hutchinson Synge Symposium 3 October 2012
- Petros Serghiou Florides (2008). John Lighton Synge Biographical Memoirs of Fellows of the Royal Society, School of Mathematics, Trinity College Dublin, doi:10.1098/rsbm.2007.0040
- Novotny, Lukas (2007). The History of Near-field Optics Adapted from Novotny, "The History of Near-field Optics," Progress in Optics 50, E. Wolf (ed.), chapter 5, p. 137- 184 (Elsevier, Amsterdam, the Netherlands)
- Rubincam, David P.; Lowman, Paul D. (2000). John Aloysius O'Keefe (1916–2000) American Astronomical Society
- Synge, E.H. (1932). "An application of piezoelectricity to microscopy". The London, Edinburgh, and Dublin Philosophical Magazine and Journal of Science. 13 (83): 297–300. doi:10.1080/14786443209461931.
- Synge, E.H. (1931). "A microscopic method". The London, Edinburgh, and Dublin Philosophical Magazine and Journal of Science. 11 (68): 65–80. doi:10.1080/14786443109461663.
- Synge, E.H. (1928). "A suggested method for extending the microscopic resolution into the ultramicroscopic region". The London, Edinburgh, and Dublin Philosophical Magazine and Journal of Science. 6 (35): 356–362. doi:10.1080/14786440808564615.
