= Klaus Blaum =

German physicist

Klaus Blaum (born 27 December 1971 in Sobernheim, now Bad Sobernheim, Germany) is a German physicist and director at the Max Planck Institute for Nuclear Physics in Heidelberg, Germany.

== Life and scientific work ==
Blaum studied physics at the Johannes Gutenberg-University Mainz, Germany. After his physics diploma in 1997 and several research visits at the Pacific Northwest National Laboratory, Richland, Washington, US, he graduated in 2000 as Doctor rerum naturalium in physics. From 2000 to 2002 he was postdoctoral research associate of GSI Darmstadt (working group of H. Jürgen Kluge) and until 2004 Research Associate (CERN Fellow) at the European Organization for Nuclear Research CERN, Geneva, Switzerland and Project Leader for "Mass spectrometry of exotic nuclides with ISOLTRAP" at ISOLDE. In October 2004 Klaus Blaum became Project Leader of the "Helmholtz Research Group for Young Investigators" on "Experiments with Stored and Cooled Ions" at the Johannes Gutenberg-University Mainz. In 2006 he habilitated in experimental physics at the University Mainz about High precision mass spectrometry with Penning traps and storage rings.

From 2004 to 2008 Blaum taught at the Johannes Gutenberg-University Mainz. His achievement was honored with the Teaching Award of Rheinland-Pfalz 2006. In October 2007 he was appointed as director and scientific member at the Max-Planck-Institute for Nuclear Physics in Heidelberg, Germany. Since April 2008 he is honorary professor (W3) at the Ruprecht-Karls-University Heidelberg, Germany. In November 2008 he was elected as a Fellow of the American Physical Society (APS). After his first term (2012–2014), he was again vice chairman of the advisory committee "Hadrons and Nuclei" of the Federal Ministry of Education and Research (BMBF) from 2018 to March 2020. During the membership period 2012–2019 Klaus Blaum was a member of the DFG (German Research Foundation) Review Board 308 "Optics, Quantum Optics and Physics of Atoms, Molecules and Plasmas". From June 2016 to December 2019 he was deputy chairman of the FAIR/GSI Joint Scientific Council, chairman of the Scientific Committee of GSI and member of the supervisory board of GSI. From July 2020 to June 2023, Klaus Blaum was vice president of the Max Planck Society and responsible for the Institutes of the Chemistry, Physics and Technology Section.

== Main research areas ==
His scientific work focuses on precision experiments with stored and cooled ions as well as the investigation of fundamental processes of molecular ions. Another main research field is the development of novel storage, cooling and detection techniques for future experiments.

== Distinctions and awards ==
- 1998: Wolfgang-Paul-Prize for Student Research of the German Mass Spectrometry Society (DGMS)
- 2004: Gustav-Hertz-Prize of the German Physical Society (DPG)
- 2005: Mattauch-Herzog-Prize of the German Society for Mass Spectrometry (DGMS)
- 2007: Teaching Award of Rheinland-Pfalz
- 2008: American Physical Society (APS) Fellowship
- 2010: GENCO Membership Award of the GSI Exotic Nuclei Community
- 2011: ERC Advanced Grant for Precision Measurements of Fundamental Constants (MEFUCO)
- 2012: Helmholtz Prize of the Physikalisch-Technische Bundesanstalt (PTB) for precision measurements (together with Anke Wagner and Sven Sturm)
- 2013: Flerov Prize (together with H.-J. Kluge and Y. Novikov)
- 2016: Gothenburg Lise Meitner Award of the Gothenburg Physics Centre
- 2019: Foreign member of the Physics Class of the Royal Swedish Academy of Sciences
- 2019: ERC Advanced Grant for the test of fundamental interactions (FunI)
- 2020: Lise Meitner Prize of the European Physical Society (EPS). (together with Björn Jonson and Piet Van Duppen)
- 2021: Otto Hahn Prize of the City of Frankfurt am Main, the German Chemical Society (GDCh) and the German Physical Society (DPG)
- 2022: Full member of the Heidelberg Academy of Sciences and Humanities (HAdW)
- 2022: Honorary Member of the Physikalischer Verein (Frankfurt am Main)
- 2023: Boltzmann Lecture 2023 at the University of Vienna
- 2024: Member of the Physics Section of the German National Academy of Sciences Leopoldina
- 2025: Stern–Gerlach Medal of the German Physical Society (DPG)
- 2026: Gottfried Wilhelm Leibniz Prize of the German Research Foundation (DFG)
- 2026: Hendrik de Waard Lecture 2026 at the University of Groningen

== Publications (selection) ==
- Wienholtz, F.; Beck, D.; Blaum, K.; Borgmann, Ch.; Breitenfeldt, M.; et al. (2013). "Masses of exotic calcium isotopes pin down nuclear forces". Nature. 498 (7454). Springer Science and Business Media LLC: 346–349. Bibcode:2013Natur.498..346W. doi:10.1038/nature12226. ISSN 0028-0836. PMID 23783629. S2CID 6287397.
- Ramirez, E. M.; Ackermann, D.; Blaum, K.; Block, M.; Droese, C.; et al. (9 August 2012). "Direct Mapping of Nuclear Shell Effects in the Heaviest Elements". Science. 337 (6099). American Association for the Advancement of Science (AAAS): 1207–1210. arXiv:1406.6477. Bibcode:2012Sci...337.1207R. doi:10.1126/science.1225636. ISSN 0036-8075. PMID 22878498. S2CID 206542945.
- Sturm, S.; Wagner, A.; Schabinger, B.; Zatorski, J.; Harman, Z.; Quint, W.; Werth, G.; Keitel, C. H.; Blaum, K. (7 July 2011). "gFactor of Hydrogenlike ^{28}Si^{13+}". Physical Review Letters. 107 (2) 023002. American Physical Society (APS). doi:10.1103/physrevlett.107.023002. ISSN 0031-9007. PMID 21797600.
- Ulmer, S.; Rodegheri, C. C.; Blaum, K.; Kracke, H.; Mooser, A.; Quint, W.; Walz, J. (20 June 2011). "Observation of Spin Flips with a Single Trapped Proton". Physical Review Letters. 106 (25) 253001. American Physical Society (APS). arXiv:1104.1206. Bibcode:2011PhRvL.106y3001U. doi:10.1103/physrevlett.106.253001. ISSN 0031-9007. PMID 21770638. S2CID 13997553.
- Block, M.; Ackermann, D.; Blaum, K.; Droese, C.; Dworschak, M.; et al. (2010). "Direct mass measurements above uranium bridge the gap to the island of stability". Nature. 463 (7282). Springer Science and Business Media LLC: 785–788. Bibcode:2010Natur.463..785B. doi:10.1038/nature08774. ISSN 0028-0836. PMID 20148034. S2CID 4407082.
- Neidherr, D.; Audi, G.; Beck, D.; Blaum, K.; Böhm, Ch.; et al. (19 March 2009). "Discovery of ^{229}Rn and the Structure of the Heaviest Rn and Ra Isotopes from Penning-Trap Mass Measurements". Physical Review Letters. 102 (11) 112501. American Physical Society (APS). doi:10.1103/physrevlett.102.112501. ISSN 0031-9007. PMID 19392194.
- George, S.; Baruah, S.; Blank, B.; Blaum, K.; Breitenfeldt, M.; Hager, U.; Herfurth, F.; Herlert, A.; Kellerbauer, A.; Kluge, H.-J.; Kretzschmar, M.; Lunney, D.; Savreux, R.; Schwarz, S.; Schweikhard, L.; Yazidjian, C. (16 April 2007). "Ramsey Method of Separated Oscillatory Fields for High-Precision Penning Trap Mass Spectrometry". Physical Review Letters. 98 (16) 162501. arXiv:nucl-ex/0701027. Bibcode:2007PhRvL..98p2501G. doi:10.1103/physrevlett.98.162501. ISSN 0031-9007. PMID 17501414. S2CID 20231802.
