= Max Planck Institute for Nuclear Physics =

Research institute in Heidelberg, Germany

Coordinates: 49°23′16″N 8°42′32″E

The Max-Planck-Institut für Kernphysik ("MPI for Nuclear Physics" or MPIK for short) is a research institute in Heidelberg, Germany.

The institute is one of the 80 institutes of the Max-Planck-Gesellschaft (Max Planck Society), an independent, non-profit research organization. The Max Planck Institute for Nuclear Physics was founded in 1958 under the leadership of Wolfgang Gentner. Its precursor was the Institute for Physics at the MPI for Medical Research.

Today, the institute's research areas are: crossroads of particle physics and astrophysics (astroparticle physics) and many-body dynamics of atoms and molecules (quantum dynamics).

The research field of Astroparticle Physics, represented by the divisions of Jim Hinton, Werner Hofmann and Susanne Mertens, combines questions related to macrocosm and microcosm. Unconventional methods of observation for gamma rays and neutrinos open new windows to the universe. What lies behind "dark matter" and "dark energy" is theoretically investigated.

The research field of Quantum Dynamics is represented by the divisions of Klaus Blaum, Christoph Keitel and Thomas Pfeifer. Using reaction microscopes, simple chemical reactions can be "filmed". Storage rings and traps allow precision experiments almost under space conditions. The interaction of intense laser light with matter is investigated using quantum-theoretical methods.

Further research fields are cosmic dust, atmospheric physics as well as fullerenes and other carbon molecules.

Scientists at the MPIK collaborate with other research groups in Europe and all over the world and are involved in numerous international collaborations, partly in a leading role. Particularly close connections to some large-scale facilities like GSI (Darmstadt), DESY (Hamburg), CERN (Geneva), TRIUMF (Canada), and INFN-LNGS (Assergi L'Aquila) exist. The institute has about 390 employees, as well as many diploma students and scientific guests.

In the local region, the Institute cooperates closely with the University of Heidelberg, where the directors and further members of the Institute are teaching. Three International Max Planck Research Schools (IMPRS) and a graduate school serve to foster young scientists.

The institute operates a cryogenic ion storage ring (CSR) dedicated to the study of molecular ions under interstellar space conditions. Several Penning ion traps are used to measure fundamental constants of nature, such as the atomic mass of the electron and of nuclei. A facility containing several electron beam ion traps (EBIT) that produce and store highly charged ions is dedicated to fundamental atomic structure as well as astrophysical investigations. Large cameras for gamma-ray telescopes (HESS, CTA), Dark Matter (XENON1t, DARWIN), and neutrino detectors are developed and tested on-site.

== Structure ==
There are five scientific divisions and several further research groups and junior groups. Scientific and technical departments as well as the administration support the researchers.

=== Departments ===
- Stored and cooled ions (Klaus Blaum)
- Non-thermal astrophysics (Jim Hinton)
- Theoretical quantum dynamics and quantum electrodynamics (Christoph H. Keitel)
- Particle and astroparticle physics (Susanne Mertens)
- Quantum dynamics and control (Thomas Pfeifer)

=== Independent research groups ===
- Cold Collisions and the Pathways toward Life in Interstellar Space (ASTROLAB)(Holger Kreckel)
- Astrophysical Plasma Theory (APT) (Brian Reville)
- Massive Neutrinos: Investigating their Theoretical Origin and Phenomenology (MANITOP) (Werner Rodejohann)
- Strong Interaction and Exotic Nuclei (Achim Schwenk)
- Theoretical Neutrino and Astroparticle Physics (Alexei Smirnov)
- High-energy astrophysics with H.E.S.S. and CTA (Werner Hofmann; emeritus)
- Plasma astrophysics (Heinrich J. Völk; emeritus)
- Random matrices, chaos and disorder in many-body quantum systems (Hans A. Weidenmüller; emeritus)
