= C. V. Raman =

Indian physicist (1888–1970)

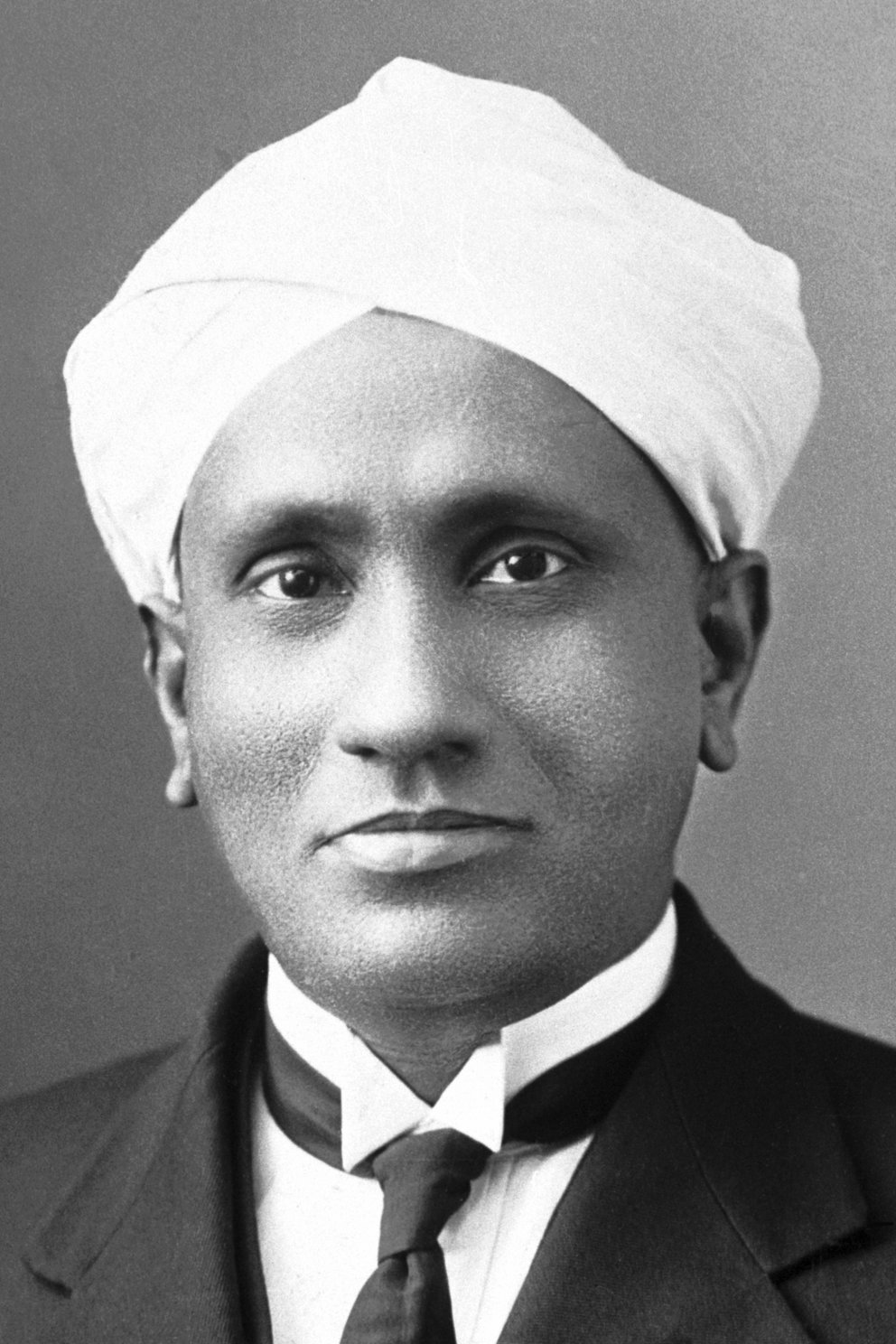
- Raman in 1930
- Born: Chandrasekhara Venkata Raman; 7 November 1888; Tiruchirapalli, Madras Presidency, British Raj
- Died: 21 November 1970 (aged 82); Bangalore, Mysore State, India
- Education: Presidency College (grad. 1904, 1907)
- Known for: Raman scattering
- Spouse: Lokasundari Ammal (m. 1907)
- Children: 2, including Radhakrishnan
- Family: Chandrasekhar
- Awards: Matteucci Medal (1928); Nobel Prize in Physics (1930); Hughes Medal (1930); Bharat Ratna (1954); Lenin Peace Prize (1958)
- Scientific career
- Fields: Physics
- Workplaces: University of Calcutta; Indian Institute of Science; Raman Research Institute
- Academic advisors: Rhishard Llewellyn Jones
- Doctoral students: Sisir Kumar Mitra; Vikram Sarabhai
- Other notable students: P. Krishnamurti; K. S. Krishnan

Chandrasekhara Venkata Raman (/ˈrɑːmən/ RAH-muhn; IAST: Candraśēkhara Veṅkaṭarāmaṉ; 7 November 1888 – 21 November 1970) was an Indian physicist known for his work in the field of light scattering. Using a spectrograph that he developed, he and his student K. S. Krishnan discovered that when light traverses a transparent material, the deflected light changes its wavelength. This phenomenon, a hitherto unknown type of scattering of light they called modified scattering, was subsequently termed the Raman effect or Raman scattering. In 1930, Raman received the Nobel Prize in Physics "for his work on the scattering of light and for the discovery of the effect named after him" and became the first Asian and non-White person to receive a Nobel Prize in Physics.

Born in the Indian state of Tamil Nadu, Raman was a precocious child, completing his secondary and higher secondary education from St Aloysius' Anglo-Indian High School at the ages of 11 and 13, respectively. He topped the bachelor's degree examination of the University of Madras with honours in physics from Presidency College at age 16. His first research paper, on diffraction of light, was published in 1906, while he was a graduate student. The next year he obtained a master's degree. He joined the Indian Finance Service in Calcutta as Assistant Accountant General at age 19. There he became acquainted with the Indian Association for the Cultivation of Science (IACS), the first research institute in India, which allowed him to carry out independent research and where he made his major contributions in acoustics and optics.

In 1917, he was appointed the first Palit Professor of Physics by Ashutosh Mukherjee at the Rajabazar Science College under the University of Calcutta. On his first trip to Europe, seeing the Mediterranean Sea motivated him to identify the prevailing explanation for the blue colour of the sea at the time, namely the reflected Rayleigh-scattered light from the sky, as incorrect. He founded the Indian Journal of Physics in 1926. He moved to Bengaluru in 1933 to become the first Indian director of the Indian Institute of Science. He founded the Indian Academy of Sciences that year. In 1948, he established the Raman Research Institute, where he worked to his last days. He was the uncle of Nobel laureate Subrahmanyan Chandrasekhar.

The Raman effect was discovered on 28 February 1928. The day is celebrated annually by the Government of India as the National Science Day.

== Early life and education ==
Chandrasekhara Venkata Raman was born on 7 November 1888 in Tiruchirappalli, India. His parents were R. Chandrasekhar Iyer and Parvathi Ammal. He was the second of eight of their children. His father was a teacher at a local high school, and earned a modest income. He recalled: "I was born with a copper spoon in my mouth. At my birth my father was earning the magnificent salary of ten rupees per month!" In 1892, his family moved to Visakhapatnam (then Vizagapatam or Vizag) in Andhra Pradesh as his father was appointed to the faculty of physics at Mrs A. V. Narasimha Rao College.

Raman was educated at the St Aloysius' Anglo-Indian High School, Visakhapatnam. He passed matriculation at age 11 and the First Examination in Arts examination (equivalent to today's intermediate examination, pre-university course) with a scholarship at age 13, securing first position in both under the Andhra Pradesh school board (now Andhra Pradesh Board of Secondary Education) examination.

In 1902, Raman joined Presidency College in Madras (now Chennai) where his father had been transferred to teach mathematics and physics. In 1904, he obtained a B. A. from the University of Madras, where he stood first and won the gold medals in physics and English. At age 18, while still a graduate student, he published his first scientific paper on "Unsymmetrical diffraction bands due to a rectangular aperture" in the British journal Philosophical Magazine in 1906. He earned an M. A. from the same university with highest distinction in 1907. His second paper published in the same journal that year was on surface tension of liquids. It was alongside Lord Rayleigh's paper on the sensitivity of ear to sound, and from which Lord Rayleigh started to communicate with Raman, courteously addressing him as Professor.

Aware of Raman's capacity, his physics teacher Rhishard Llewellyn Jones insisted he continue research in England. Jones arranged for Raman's physical inspection with Colonel (Sir Gerald) Giffard. Raman often had poor health and was considered as a "weakling". The inspection revealed that he would not withstand the harsh weathers of England, the incident of which he later recalled, and said, "[Giffard] examined me and certified that I was going to die of tuberculosis . . . if I were to go to England".

== Career ==
Raman's elder brother C. Subrahmanya Ayyar had joined the prestigious Indian government service, Indian Finance Service (now Indian Audit and Accounts Service). Raman followed suit and qualified for the Indian Finance Service achieving first position in the entrance examination in February 1907. He was posted in Calcutta (now Kolkata) as Assistant Accountant General in June 1907.

He was highly impressed by the Indian Association for the Cultivation of Science (IACS), Calcutta, the first research institute founded in India in 1876. He immediately befriended Asutosh Dey (who would eventually become his lifelong collaborator), Amrita Lal Sircar (the founder Mahendralal Sircar's son and then secretary of IACS), and Ashutosh Mukherjee (then executive member of the IACS and Vice-Chancellor of the University of Calcutta). With their support, he obtained permission to conduct research at IACS in his own time, even at "very unusual hours," as Raman later reminisced. Up to that time the institute had not yet recruited regular researchers, or produced any research paper. Raman's article "Newton's rings in polarised light" published in Nature in 1907 became the first from the institute. The work inspired IACS to publish a journal, Bulletin of Indian Association for the Cultivation of Science, in 1909 in which Raman was the major contributor.

In 1909, Raman was transferred to Rangoon, British Burma (now Myanmar), to take up the position of currency officer. After only a few months, he had to return to Madras as his father died from an illness. The subsequent death of his father and funeral rituals compelled him to remain there for the rest of the year. Soon after he resumed office at Rangoon, he was transferred back to India at Nagpur, Maharashtra, in 1910. Even before he served a year in Nagpur, he was promoted to Accountant General in 1911 and again posted to Calcutta.

From 1915, the University of Calcutta started assigning research scholars under Raman at IACS. Sudhangsu Kumar Banerji (who later become Director General of Observatories of India Meteorological Department), a PhD scholar under Ganesh Prasad, was his first student. From the next year, other universities followed suit including University of Allahabad, Rangoon University, Queen's College (Indore), Institute of Science, Nagpur, Krishnath College, and University of Madras. By 1919, Raman had guided more than a dozen students. Following Sircar's death in 1919, Raman received two honorary positions at IACS — Honorary Professor and Honorary Secretary. He referred to this period as the "golden era" of his life.

Raman was chosen by the University of Calcutta to become the Palit Professor of Physics, a position established after the benefactor Sir Taraknath Palit, in 1913. The university senate made the appointment on 30 January 1914, as recorded in the meeting minutes:

The following appointments to the Palit Professorships were made at the meeting of the Senate on 30 January 1914: Dr P. C. Ray and Mr C. V. Raman, MA... The appointment of each Professor shall be permanent. A Professor shall vacate his office upon completion of sixtieth year of his age.

Prior to 1914, Ashutosh Mukherjee had invited Jagadish Chandra Bose to take up the position, but Bose declined. As a second choice, Raman became the first Palit Professor of Physics but was delayed for taking up the position as World War I broke out. It was only in 1917 when he joined Rajabazar Science College, a campus created by the University of Calcutta in 1914, that he became a full-fledged professor. He reluctantly resigned as a civil servant after a decade of service, which was described as "supreme sacrifice" since his salary as a professor would be roughly half of his salary at the time. But to his advantage, the terms and conditions as a professor were explicitly indicated in the report of his joining the university, which stated:

Mr C. V. Raman's acceptance of the Sir T. N. Palit Professorship on condition that he will not be required to go out of India... Reported that Mr C. V. Raman joined his appointment as Palit Professor of Physics from 2.7.17... Mr Raman informed that he will not be required to take any teaching work in MA and MSc classes, to the detriment of his own research or assisting advanced students in their researches.

Raman's appointment as the Palit Professor was strongly objected to by some members of the Senate of the University of Calcutta, especially foreign members, as he had no PhD and had never studied abroad. As a kind of rebuttal, Ashutosh Mukherjee arranged for an honorary DSc which the University of Calcutta conferred Raman in 1921. The same year he visited Oxford to deliver a lecture at the Congress of Universities of the British Empire. He had earned quite a reputation by then, and his hosts were Nobel laureates J. J. Thomson and Lord Rutherford. In addition, his student N. C. Krishna Aiyar was named among the very first Fellows of the American Physical Society in 1921. Upon his own election as Fellow of the Royal Society in 1924, Mukherjee asked him of his future plans, which he replied, saying, "The Nobel Prize of course". In 1926, he established the Indian Journal of Physics and acted as the first editor. The second volume of the journal published his famous article "A new radiation", reporting the discovery of the Raman effect.

Raman was succeeded by Debendra Mohan Bose as the Palit Professor in 1932. Following his appointment as Director of the Indian Institute of Science (IISc) in Bangalore, he left Calcutta in 1933. Maharaja Krishnaraja Wadiyar IV, the King of Mysore, Jamsetji Tata and Nawab Sir Mir Osman Ali Khan, the Nizam of Hyderabad, had contributed the lands and funds for the Indian Institute of Science in Bangalore. The Viceroy of India, Lord Minto approved the establishment in 1909, and the British government appointed its first director, Morris Travers. Raman became the fourth director and the first Indian director. During his tenure at IISc, he recruited G. N. Ramachandran, who later went on to become a distinguished X-ray crystallographer. He founded the Indian Academy of Sciences in 1934 and started publishing the academy's journal Proceedings of the Indian Academy of Sciences (later split up into Proceedings - Mathematical Sciences, Journal of Chemical Sciences, and Journal of Earth System Science). Around that time the Calcutta Physical Society was established, the concept of which he had initiated early in 1917.

With his former student Panchapakesa Krishnamurti, Raman started a company called Travancore Chemical and Manufacturing Co. Ltd. in 1943. The company, renamed as TCM Limited in 1996, was one of the first organic and inorganic chemical manufacturers in India. In 1947, Raman was appointed the first National Professor by the new government of independent India.

Raman retired from IISc in 1948 and established the Raman Research Institute in Bangalore a year later. He served as its director and remained active there until his death in 1970.

== Scientific contributions ==
Energy level diagram showing the states involved in Raman signal

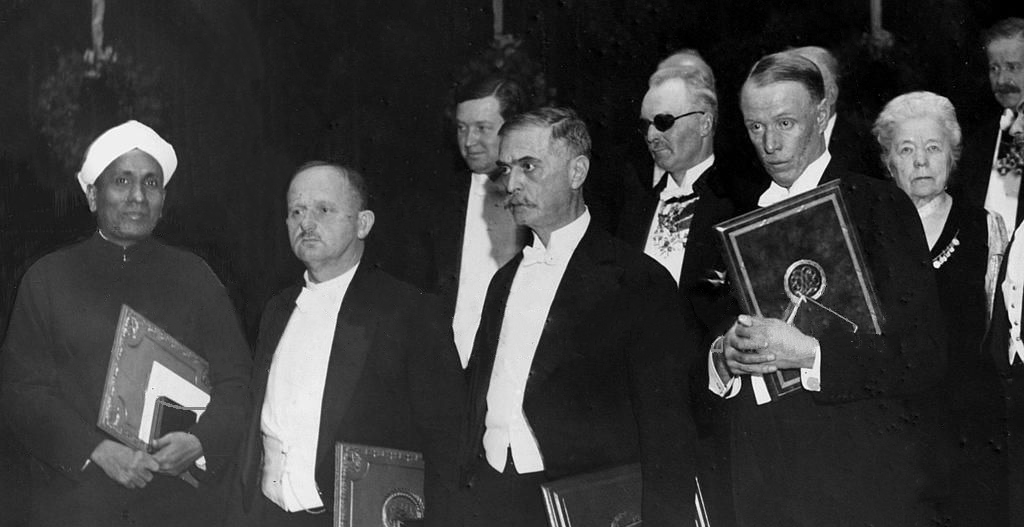
Raman at the 1930 Nobel Prize Award Ceremony with other winners, from left C. V. Raman (physics), Hans Fischer (chemistry), Karl Landsteiner (medicine) and Sinclair Lewis (literature)

=== Musical sound ===
One of Raman's interests was on the scientific basis of musical sounds. He was inspired by Hermann von Helmholtz's The Sensations of Tone, the book he came across when he joined IACS. He published his findings prolifically between 1916 and 1921. He worked out the theory of transverse vibration of bowed string instruments based on superposition of velocities. One of his earliest studies was on the wolf tone in violins and cellos. He studied the acoustics of various violin and related instruments, including Indian stringed instruments, and water splashes. He even performed what he called "Experiments with mechanically-played violins".

Raman also studied the uniqueness of Indian drums. His analyses of the harmonic nature of the sounds of tabla and mridangam were the first scientific studies on Indian percussions. He wrote a critical research on vibrations of the pianoforte string that was known as Kaufmann's theory (the first scientific description of vibration of musical strings made by German physicist Walter Kaufmann in 1895). During his brief visit of England in 1921, he managed to study how sound travels in the Whispring Gallery of the dome of St Paul's Cathedral in London that produces unusual sound effects. His work on acoustics was an important prelude, both experimentally and conceptually, to his later works on optics and quantum mechanics.

=== Blue color of the sea ===
Raman, in his broadening venture on optics, started to investigate scattering of light starting in 1919. His first phenomenal discovery of the physics of light was the blue color of seawater. During a voyage home from England on board the S. S. Narkunda in September 1921, he contemplated the blue color of the Mediterranean Sea. Using simple optical equipment, a pocket-sized spectroscope and a Nicol prism in hand, he studied the sea water. Of several hypotheses on the colour of the sea propounded at the time, the best explanation had been that of Lord Rayleigh's in 1910, according to which, "The much admired dark blue of the deep sea has nothing to do with the color of water, but is simply the blue of the sky seen by reflection". Rayleigh had correctly described the nature of the blue sky by a phenomenon now known as Rayleigh scattering, the scattering of light and refraction by particles in the atmosphere. His explanation of the blue colour of water was instinctively accepted as correct. Raman could view the water using a Nicol prism to avoid the influence of sunlight reflected by the surface. He described how the sea appears even more blue than usual, contradicting Rayleigh.

As soon as the S. S. Narkunda docked in Bombay Harbour (now Mumbai Harbour), Raman finished an article "The colour of the sea" that was published in the November 1921 issue of Nature. He noted that Rayleigh's explanation is "questionable by a simple mode of observation" (using Nicol prism). As he thought:

Looking down into the water with a Nicol in front of the eye to cut off surface reflections, the track of the sun's rays could be seen entering the water and appearing by virtue of perspective to converge to a point at a considerable depth inside it. The question is: What is it that diffracts the light and makes its passage visible? An interesting possibility that should be considered in this connection is that the diffracting particles may, at least in part, be the molecules of the water themselves.

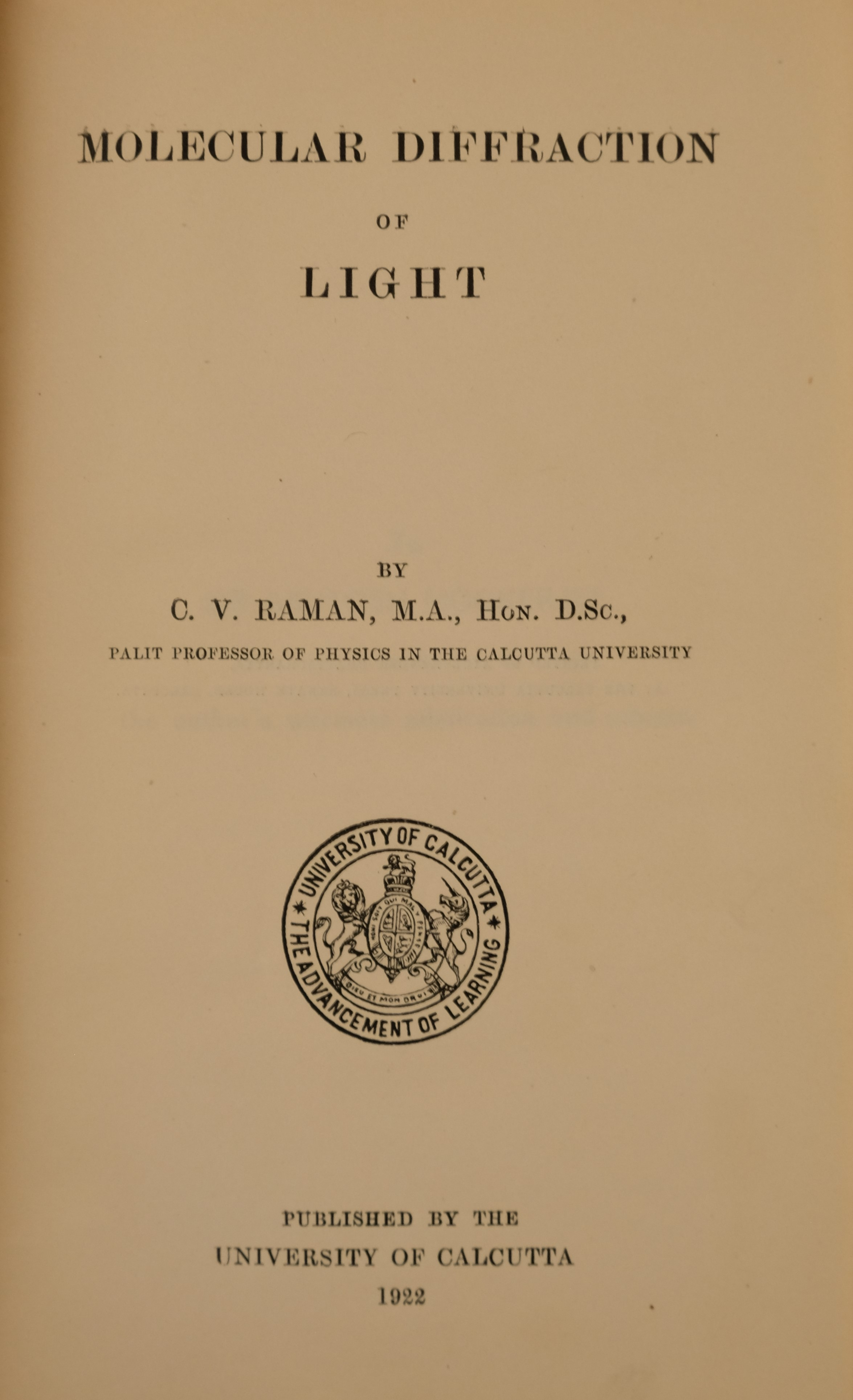
Title page to Raman's Molecular Diffraction of Light (1922)

When he reached Calcutta, he asked his student K. R. Ramanathan, who was from the University of Rangoon, to conduct further research at IACS. By early 1922, Raman came to a conclusion, as he reported in the Proceedings of the Royal Society of London:

It is proposed in this paper to urge an entirely different view, that in this phenomenon, as in the parallel case of the colour of the sky, molecular diffraction determines the observed luminosity and in great measure also its colour. As a necessary preliminary to the discussion, a theoretical calculation and experimental observations of the intensity of molecular scattering in water will be presented.

True to his words, Ramanathan published an elaborate experimental finding in 1923. His subsequent study of the Bay of Bengal in 1924 provided the full evidence. It is now known that the intrinsic colour of water is mainly attributed to the selective absorption of longer wavelengths of light in the red and orange regions of the spectrum, owing to overtones of the infrared absorbing O-H (oxygen and hydrogen combined) stretching modes of water molecules.

=== Raman effect ===
==== Background ====
Raman's second important discovery on the scattering of light was a new type of radiation, an eponymous phenomenon called the Raman effect. After discovering the nature of light scattering that caused blue colour of water, he focused on the principle behind the phenomenon. His experiments in 1923 showed the possibility of other light rays formed in addition to the incident ray when sunlight was filtered through a violet glass in certain liquids and solids. Ramanathan believed that this was a case of a "trace of fluorescence". In 1925, K. S. Krishnan, a new research associate, noted the theoretical background for the existence of an additional scattering line beside the usual polarised elastic scattering when light scatters through liquid. He referred to the phenomenon as "feeble fluorescence". But the theoretical attempts to justify the phenomenon were quite futile for the next two years.

The major impetus was the discovery of Compton effect. Arthur Compton at Washington University in St. Louis had found evidence in 1923 that electromagnetic waves can also be described as particles. By 1927, the phenomenon was widely accepted by scientists, including Raman. As the news of Compton's Nobel Prize in Physics was announced in December 1927, Raman ecstatically told Krishnan, saying:

Excellent news... very nice indeed. But look here Krishnan. If this is true of X-Rays, it must be true of Light too. I have always thought so. There must be an Optical analogue to Compton Effect. We must pursue it and we are on the right lines. It must and shall be found. The Nobel Prize must be won.

But the origin of the inspiration went further. As Compton later recollected "that it was probably the Toronto debate that led him to discover the Raman effect two years later". The Toronto debate was about the discussion on the existence of light quantum at the British Association for the Advancement of Science meeting held at Toronto in 1924. There Compton presented his experimental findings, which William Duane of Harvard University argued with his own with evidence that light was a wave. Raman took Duane's side and said, "Compton, you're a very good debater, but the truth isn't in you".

==== The scattering experiments ====
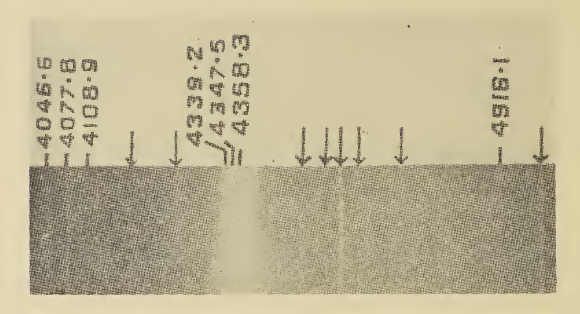
An early Raman spectrum of benzene published by Raman and Krishnan

Krishnan started the experiment in the beginning of January 1928. On 7 January, he discovered that no matter what kind of pure liquid he used, it always produced polarised fluorescence within the visible spectrum of light. As Raman saw the result, he was astonished why he never observed such phenomenon all those years. That night he and Krishnan named the new phenomenon as "modified scattering" with reference to the Compton effect as an unmodified scattering. On 16 February, they sent a manuscript to Nature titled "A new type of secondary radiation", which was published on 31 March.

On 28 February 1928, they obtained spectra of the modified scattering separate from the incident light. Due to difficulty in measuring the wavelengths of light, they had been relying on visual observation of the colour produced from sunlight through prism. Raman had invented a type of spectrograph for detecting and measuring electromagnetic waves. Referring to the invention, Raman later remarked, "When I got my Nobel Prize, I had spent hardly 200 rupees on my equipment," although it was obvious that his total expenditure for the entire experiment was much more than that. From that moment they could employ the instrument using monochromatic light from a mercury arc lamp which penetrated transparent material and was allowed to fall on a spectrograph to record its spectrum. The lines of scattering could now be measured and photographed.

==== Announcement ====
The same day, Raman made the announcement before the press. The Associated Press of India reported it the next day, on 29 February, as "New theory of radiation: Prof. Raman's Discovery". It ran the story as:

Prof. C. V. Raman, FRS., of the Calcutta University, has made a discovery which promises to be of fundamental significance to physics... The new phenomenon exhibits features even more startling than those discovered by Prof. Compton with X-rays. The principal feature observed is that when matter is excited by light of one colour, the atoms contained in it emit light of two colours, one of which is different from the exciting colour and is lower down the spectrum. The astonishing thing is that the altered colour is quite independent of the nature of the substance used.

The news was reproduced by The Statesman on 1 March under the headline "Scattering of Light by Atoms – New Phenomenon – Calcutta Professor's Discovery". Raman submitted a three-paragraph report of the discovery on 8 March to Nature and was published on 21 April. The actual data was sent to the same journal on 22 March and was published on 5 May. Raman presented the formal and detailed description as "A new radiation" at the meeting of the South Indian Science Association in Bangalore on 16 March. His lecture was published in the Indian Journal of Physics on 31 March. A thousand copies of the paper reprint were sent to scientists in different countries on that day.

==== Reception and outcome ====
Some physicists, particularly French and German physicists were initially sceptical of the authenticity of the discovery. Georg Joos at the University of Jena asked Arnold Sommerfeld at the Ludwig-Maximilians-Universität München, "Do you think that Raman's work on the optical Compton effect in liquids is reliable?. . . The sharpness of the scattered lines in liquids seems doubtful to me". Sommerfeld then tried to reproduce the experiment, but failed. On 20 June 1928, Peter Pringsheim at the Friedrich Wilhelm University of Berlin was able to reproduce Raman's results successfully. He was the first to coin the terms Ramaneffekt and Linien des Ramaneffekts in his articles published the following months. Use of the English versions, "Raman effect" and "Raman lines" immediately followed.

In addition to being a new phenomenon itself, the Raman effect was one of the earliest proofs of the quantum nature of light. Robert W. Wood at the Johns Hopkins University was the first American to confirm the Raman effect in early 1929. He made a series of experimental verification, after which he commented, saying, "It appears to me that this very beautiful discovery which resulted from Raman's long and patient study of the phenomenon of light scattering is one of the most convincing proofs of the quantum theory". The field of Raman spectroscopy came to be based on this phenomenon, and Ernest Rutherford, President of the Royal Society, referred to it in his presentation of the Hughes Medal to Raman in 1930 as "among the best three or four discoveries in experimental physics in the last decade".

Raman was confident that he would win the Nobel Prize in Physics as well but was disappointed when the Nobel Prize went to Owen Richardson in 1928 and to Louis de Broglie in 1929. He was so confident of winning the prize in 1930 that he booked tickets in July, even though the awards were to be announced in November. He would scan each day's newspaper for announcement of the prize, tossing it away if it did not carry the news. He did eventually win that year.

=== Later work ===
Raman had association with the Banaras Hindu University in Varanasi. He attended the foundation ceremony of BHU and delivered lectures on mathematics and "Some new paths in physics" during the lecture series organised at the university from 5 to 8 February 1916. He also held the position of permanent visiting professor.

With Suri Bhagavantam, he determined the spin of photons in 1932, which further confirmed the quantum nature of light. With another student, Nagendra Nath, he provided the correct theoretical explanation for the acousto-optic effect (light scattering by sound waves) in a series of articles resulting in the celebrated Raman–Nath theory. Modulators, and switching systems based on this effect have enabled optical communication components based on laser systems.

Other investigations he carried out included experimental and theoretical studies on the diffraction of light by acoustic waves of ultrasonic and hypersonic frequencies, and those on the effects produced by X-rays on infrared vibrations in crystals exposed to ordinary light which were published between 1935 and 1942.

In 1948, through studying the spectroscopic behaviour of crystals, he approached the fundamental problems of crystal dynamics in a new manner. He dealt with the structure and properties of diamond from 1944 to 1968, the structure and optical behaviour of numerous iridescent substances including labradorite, pearly feldspar, agate, quartz, opal, and pearl in the early 1950s. Among his other interests were the optics of colloids, and electrical and magnetic anisotropy. His last interests in the 1960s were on biological properties such as the colours of flowers and the physiology of human vision.

== Personal life ==
Raman married Lokasundari Ammal, daughter of S. Krishnaswami Iyer who was the Superintendent of Sea Customs at Madras, in 1907. The wedding day is popularly recorded as on 6 May, but Raman's great-niece and biographer, Uma Parameswaran, revealed a factual date of 2 June 1907. It was a self-arranged marriage and his wife was 13 years old. (Sources are contradicting on her age as her birth year is specified as 1892, which would make her about 15 years of age; but Parameswaran affirmed the 13-year, corroborated by her obituary in Current Science that mentioned her age as 86 on her death on 22 May 1980.) His wife later jokingly recounted that their marriage was not so much about her musical prowess (she was playing veena when they first met) as "the extra allowance which the Finance Department gave to its married officers". The extra allowance refers to an additional INR 150 for married officers at the time. Soon after they moved to Calcutta in 1907, the couple were accused of converting to Christianity. It was because they frequently visited St. John's Church, Kolkata as Lokasundari was fascinated with the church music (unlike Raman's sisters Meena and Sitalakshmi) and he with the acoustics.

They had two sons, Chandrasekhar Raman and Venkatraman Radhakrishnan, a radio astronomer. He later cut his relations with his elder son due to ideological disputes. Raman's elder brother C. Subrahmanya Ayyar's son Subrahmanyan Chandrasekhar won the 1983 Nobel Prize in Physics. Raman's sister Sitalakshmi's son is condensed matter physicist Sivaramakrishna Chandrasekhar.

Throughout his life, Raman developed an extensive personal collection of stones, minerals, and materials with interesting light-scattering properties, which he obtained from his world travels and as gifts. He often carried a small, handheld spectroscope to study specimens. These, along with his spectrograph, are on display at IISc.

Lord Rutherford was instrumental in some of Raman's most pivotal moments in life. He nominated Raman for the Nobel Prize in Physics in 1930, presented him the Hughes Medal as President of the Royal Society in 1930, and recommended him for the position of Director at IISc in 1932.

Raman had a sense of obsession with the Nobel Prize. In a speech at the University of Calcutta, he said, "I'm not flattered by the honour [Fellowship to the Royal Society in 1924] done to me. This is a small achievement. If there is anything that I aspire for, it is the Nobel Prize. You will find that I get that in five years". He knew that if he were to receive the Nobel Prize, he could not wait for the announcement of the Nobel Committee normally made towards the end of the year considering the time required to reach Sweden by sea route. With confidence, he booked two tickets, one for his wife, for a steamship to Stockholm in July 1930. Soon after he received the Nobel Prize, he was asked in an interview the possible consequences if he had discovered the Raman effect earlier, which he replied, "Then I should have shared the Nobel Prize with Compton and I should not have liked that; I would rather receive the whole of it".

=== Religious views ===
Although Raman hardly talked about religion, he was openly an agnostic, but objected to being labelled atheist. His agnosticism was largely influenced by that of his father who adhered to the philosophies of Herbert Spencer, Charles Bradlaugh, and Robert G. Ingersoll. He resented Hindu traditional rituals but did not give them up in family circles. He was also influenced by the philosophy of Advaita Vedanta. Traditional pagri (Indian turban) with a tuft underneath and a upanayana (Hindu sacred thread) were his signature attire. Though it was not customary to wear turbans in South Indian culture, he explained his habit as, "Oh, if I did not wear one, my head will swell. You all praise me so much and I need a turban to contain my ego". He even attributed his turban for the recognition he received on his first visit to England, particularly from J. J. Thomson and Lord Rutherford. In a public speech, he once said,

There is no Heaven, no Swarga, no Hell, no rebirth, no reincarnation and no immortality. The only thing that is true is that a man is born, he lives and he dies. Therefore, he should live his life properly.

In a friendly meeting with Mahatma Gandhi and Gilbert Rahm, a German zoologist, the conversation turned to religion. Raman spoke,

I shall answer your [Rahm's] question. If there is a God we must look for him in the Universe. If he is not there, he is not worth looking for... The growing discoveries in the science of astronomy and physics seem to be further and further revelations of God.

On his deathbed, he said to his wife, "I believe only in the Spirit of Man," and asked for his funeral, "Just a clean and simple cremation for me, no mumbo-jumbo please".

== Death ==
At the end of October 1970, Raman had a cardiac arrest and collapsed in his laboratory. He was moved to the hospital where doctors diagnosed his condition and declared that he would not survive for another four hours. He however survived a few days and requested to stay in the gardens of his institute surrounded by his followers and fans.

Two days before Raman died, he told one of his former students, "Do not allow the journals of the Academy to die, for they are the sensitive indicators of the quality of science being done in the country and whether science is taking root in it or not". That evening, Raman met with the Board of Management of his institute in his bedroom and discussed with them the fate of the institute's management. He also willed his wife to perform a simple cremation without any rituals upon his death. He died from natural causes early the next morning on 21 November 1970 at the age of 82.

With the news of Raman's death, Prime Minister Indira Gandhi publicly announced, saying,

The country, the House [of Parliament], and everyone of us will mourn the death of Dr. C. V. Raman. He was the greatest scientist of modern India and one of the greatest intellects our country has produced in its long history. His mind was like the diamond, which he studied and explained. His life's work consisted in throwing light upon the nature of lights, and the world honoured him in many ways for the new knowledge which he won for science.

== Controversies ==
=== The Nobel Prize ===
==== Independent discovery ====
In 1928, Grigory Landsberg and Leonid Mandelstam at the Moscow State University independently discovered the Raman effect. They published their findings in July issue of Naturwissenschaften, and presented their findings at the Sixth Congress of the Russian Association of Physicists held at Saratov between 5 and 16 August. In 1930, they were nominated for the Nobel Prize alongside Raman. According to the Nobel Committee, however: (1) the Russians did not come to an independent interpretation of their discovery as they cited Raman's article; (2) they observed the effect only in crystals, whereas Raman and Krishnan observed it in solids, liquids and gases, and therefore proved the universal nature of the effect; (3) the problems concerning the intensity of Raman and infrared lines in the spectra had been explained during the previous year; (4) the Raman method had been applied with great success in different fields of molecular physics; and (5) the Raman effect had effectively helped to check the symmetry properties of molecules, and thus the problems concerning nuclear spin in atomic physics.

The Nobel Committee proposed only Raman's name to the Royal Swedish Academy of Sciences for the Nobel Prize. Evidence later appeared that the Russians had discovered the phenomenon earlier, a week before Raman and Krishnan's discovery. According to Mandelstam's letter (to Orest Khvolson), the Russian had observed the spectral line on 21 February 1928.

==== Role of Krishnan ====
Krishnan was not nominated for the Nobel Prize even though he was the main researcher in discovering the Raman effect. He alone first noted the new scattering. Krishnan co-authored all the scientific papers on the discovery in 1928 except two. He alone wrote all the follow-up studies. Krishnan himself never claimed himself worthy of the prize. But Raman admitted later that Krishnan was the co-discoverer. He however remained openly antagonistic towards Krishnan, which the latter described as "the greatest tragedy of my life". After Krishnan's death, Raman said to a correspondent from The Times of India, "Krishnan was the greatest charlatan I have known, and all his life he masqueraded in the cloak of another man's discovery".

=== The Raman–Born controversy ===
From October 1933 to March 1934, Max Born was employed by IISc as Reader in Theoretical Physics following the invitation by Raman early in 1933. Born at the time was a refugee from Nazi Germany and temporarily employed at St John's College, Cambridge. Since the beginning of the 20th century Born had developed a theory on lattice dynamics based on thermal properties. He presented his theory in one of his lectures at IISc. By then Raman had developed a different theory and claimed that Born's theory contradicted the experimental data. Their debate lasted for decades.

In this dispute, Born received support from most physicists, as his view was proven to be a better explanation. Raman's theory was generally regarded as having partial relevance. Beyond the intellectual debate, their rivalry extended to personal and social levels. Born later said that Raman probably thought of him as an "enemy". Despite the mounting evidence for Born's theory, Raman refused to concede. As the editor of Current Science he rejected articles that supported Born's theory. Born was nominated several times for the Nobel Prize specifically for his contributions to lattice theory, and eventually won it for his statistical works on quantum mechanics in 1954. The account was written as a "belated Nobel Prize".

=== Indian authorities ===
Raman had an aversion to the then Prime Minister of India Jawaharlal Nehru and Nehru's policies on science. In one instance he smashed the bust of Nehru on the floor. In another, he shattered his Bharat Ratna medallion to pieces with a hammer, as it was given to him by the Nehru government. He publicly ridiculed Nehru when the latter visited the Raman Research Institute in 1948. There they displayed a piece of gold and copper against an ultraviolet light. Nehru was tricked into believing that copper which glowed more brilliantly than any other metal was gold. Raman was quick to remark, "Mr Prime Minister, everything that glitters is not gold".

On the same occasion, Nehru offered Raman financial assistance to his institute which Raman flatly refused by replying, "I certainly don't want this to become another government laboratory". Raman was particularly against the control of research programmes by the government such as in the establishment of the Bhabha Atomic Research Centre (BARC), Defence Research and Development Organisation (DRDO), and the Council of Scientific and Industrial Research (CSIR). He remained hostile to people associated with these establishments including Homi J. Bhabha, S. S. Bhatnagar, and his once favourite student, Krishnan. He even called such programmes as the "Nehru–Bhatnagar effect". In 1959, Raman proposed to establish another research institute in Madras. The Government of Madras advised him to apply for funds from the central government. But Raman clearly foresaw as he replied to C. Subramaniam, then the Minister for Finance Education in Madras, that his proposal to Nehru's government "would be met with a refusal". So ended the plan.

Raman described AICC authorities as "a big tamasha" (drama or spectacle) that just kept on discussing issues without action. As to problems of food resources in India, his advice to the government was, "We must stop breeding like pigs and the matter will solve itself".

==== Indian Academy of Sciences ====
The Indian Academy of Sciences was born out of conflicts during the procedures of the proposal for a national scientific organisation in line with the Royal Society. In 1933, the Indian Science Congress Association (ISCA), at the time the largest scientific organisation, planned to establish a national science body, which would be authorised to advise the government on scientific matters. Sir Richard Gregory, then editor of Nature, on his visit to India had suggested Raman, as editor of Current Science, to establish an Indian Academy of Sciences. Raman thought that it should be an exclusively Indian membership as opposed to the general consensus that British members should be included. He resolved "How can India Science prosper under the tutelage of an academy which has its own council of 30, 15 of who are Britishers of whom only two or three are fit enough to be its Fellows". On 1 April 1933, he convened a separate meeting of the South Indian scientists. He and Subba Rao officially resigned from ISCA.

Raman registered the new organisation as the Indian Academy of Sciences on 24 April to the Registrar of Societies. It was a provisional name to be changed to the Royal Society of India after approval from the Royal Charter. The Government of India did not recognise it as an official national scientific body, as such the ICSA created a separate organisation named the National Institute of Sciences of India on 7 January 1935 (but again changed to the Indian National Science Academy in 1970). INSA had been led by the foremost rivals of Raman including Meghnad Saha, Bhabha, Bhatnagar, and Krishnan.

==== Indian Institute of Science ====
Raman had a great fallout with the authorities at the Indian Institute of Science (IISc). He was accused of biased development in physics while ignoring other fields. He lacked diplomatic personality with other colleagues, which S. Ramaseshan, his nephew and later Director of IISc, reminisced, saying, "Raman went in there like a bull in a china shop". He wanted research in physics at the level of those of western institutes, but at the expense of other fields of science. Born observed, "Raman found a sleepy place where very little work was being done by a number of extremely well–paid people". At the Council meeting, Kenneth Aston, professor in the Electrical Technology Department, harshly criticised Raman and Raman's recruitment of Born. Raman had every intention of giving the full position of professor to Born. Aston even made a personal attack on Born by referring to him as someone "who was rejected by his own country, a renegade and therefore a second-rate scientist unfit to be part of the faculty, much less to be the head of the department of physics".

The Council of IISc constituted a review committee to oversee Raman's conduct in January 1936. The committee, chaired by James Irvine, Principal and Vice-Chancellor of the University of St Andrews, reported in March that Raman had misused the funds and entirely shifted the "centre of gravity" towards research in physics, and also that the proposal of Born as Professor of Mathematical Physics (which was already approved by the Council in November 1935) was not financially feasible. The Council offered Raman two choices, either to resign from the institute with effect from 1 April or resign as the Director and continue as Professor of physics; if he did not make the choice, he was to be fired. Raman was inclined to take up the second choice.

=== The Royal Society ===
Raman never seemed to have thought highly of the Fellowship of the Royal Society. He tendered his resignation as a Fellow on 9 March 1968, which the Council of the Royal Society accepted on 4 April. However, the exact reason was not documented. One reason could be Raman's objection to the designation "British subjects" as one of the categories of the Fellows. Particularly after the Independence of India, the Royal Society had its own disputes on this matter.

According to Subrahmanyan Chandrasekhar, The London Times had once made a list of the Fellows, in which Raman was omitted. Raman wrote to and demanded an explanation from Patrick Blackett, the then President of the society. He was dejected by Blackett's response that the society had no role in the newspaper. According to Krishnan, another cause was a disapproving review Raman received on a manuscript he had submitted to the Proceedings of the Royal Society. It could have been these cumulative factors as Raman wrote in his resignation letter, and said, "I have taken this decision after careful consideration of all the circumstances of the case. I would request that my resignation be accepted and my name removed from the list of the Fellows of the Society".

=== Views on Women pursuing research ===
In 1933, Kamala Sohonie applied to the Indian Institute of Science for a research fellowship, her application was turned down by Raman on the grounds that women were not considered competent enough to pursue research. Kamala responded to the rejection by holding a protest "satyagraha" outside Raman's office, which persuaded him to grant her admission, but with some humiliating stipulations.

Sohonie became the first woman to be admitted into the institute. She would later say, "Though Raman was a great scientist, he was very narrow-minded. I can never forget the way he treated me just because I was a woman. Even then, Raman didn't admit me as a regular student. This was a great insult to me. The bias against women was so bad at that time. What can one expect if even a Nobel Laureate behaves in such a way?" Also after a year, many women got their admission to the institution.

== Honours and awards ==
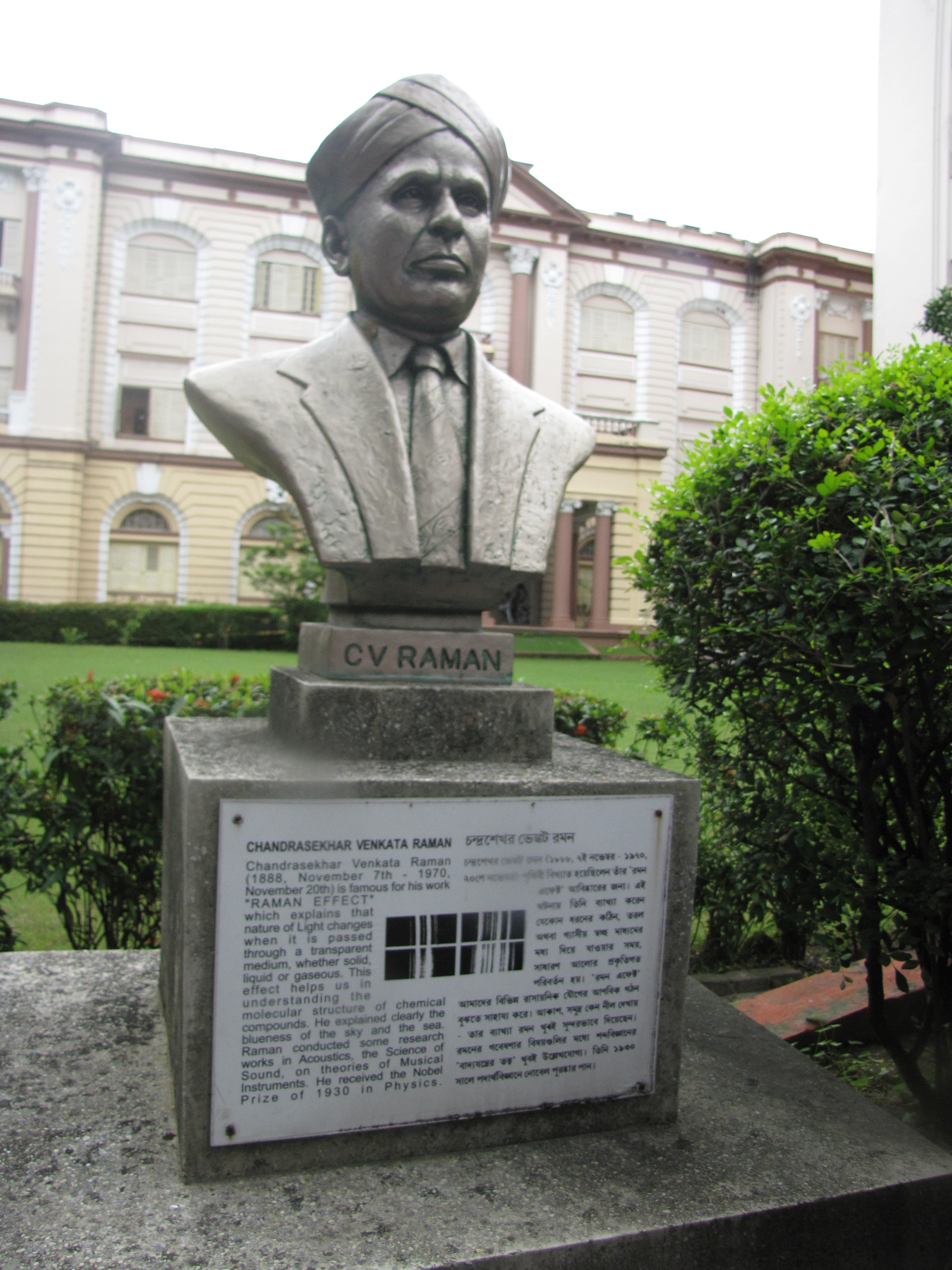
Bust of Chandrasekhara Venkata Raman in the garden of Birla Industrial & Technological Museum

Raman was honoured with many honorary doctorates and memberships of scientific societies. Within India, apart from being the founder and President of the Indian Academy of Sciences (FASc), he was a Fellow of the Asiatic Society of Bengal (FASB), and from 1943, a Foundation Fellow of the Indian Association for the Cultivation of Science (FIAS). In 1935, he was appointed a Foundation Fellow of the National Institute of Sciences of India (FNI, now the Indian National Science Academy. (Note: Prior to 1970, the Indian National Science Academy was named the "National Institute of Sciences of India", and its fellows bore the post-nominal "FNI". The post-nominal became "FNA" in 1970 when the association adopted its present name.) (Note: Although elected a fellow in 1935, Raman failed to complete the formal steps required to be considered an active fellow and his fellowship thereby lapsed. The Academy, however, continues to list him as a "deceased fellow.") He was a member of the Deutsche Akademie of Munich, the Swiss Physical Society of Zürich, the Royal Philosophical Society of Glasgow, the Royal Irish Academy, the Hungarian Academy of Sciences, the Academy of Sciences of the USSR, the Optical Society of America (Honorary Member), the Mineralogical Society of America, the Romanian Academy of Sciences, the Catgut Acoustical Society of America and the Czechoslovak Academy of Sciences.

In 1924, he was elected a Fellow of the Royal Society. However, he resigned from the fellowship in 1968 for unrecorded reasons, the only Indian FRS ever to do so.

He was the President of the 16th session of the Indian Science Congress in 1929. He was the founder and President of the Indian Academy of Sciences from 1933 until his death. He was member of the Pontifical Academy of Sciences in 1961.

=== Awards ===
- In 1912, Raman received the Curzon Research Award, while still working in the Indian Finance Service.
- In 1913, he received the Woodburn Research Medal, while still working in the Indian Finance Service.
- In 1928, he received the Matteucci Medal from the Accademia Nazionale delle Scienze in Rome.
- In 1930, he was knighted. An approval for his inclusion in the 1929 Birthday Honours was delayed, and Lord Irwin, the Viceroy of India, conferred him a Knight Bachelor in a special ceremony at the Viceroy's House (now Rashtrapati Bhavan) in New Delhi.
- In 1930, he won the Nobel Prize in Physics "for his work on the scattering of light and for the discovery of the effect named after him". He was the first Asian and the first non-white to receive any Nobel Prize in the sciences. Before him, Rabindranath Tagore (also Indian) had received the Nobel Prize for Literature in 1913.
- In 1930, he received the Hughes Medal of the Royal Society.
- In 1941, he was awarded the Franklin Medal by the Franklin Institute in Philadelphia.
- In 1954, he was awarded the Bharat Ratna (along with politician and former Governor-General of India C. Rajagopalachari and philosopher Sir Sarvepalli Radhakrishnan).
- In 1957, he was awarded the Lenin Peace Prize.

=== Posthumous recognition and contemporary references ===
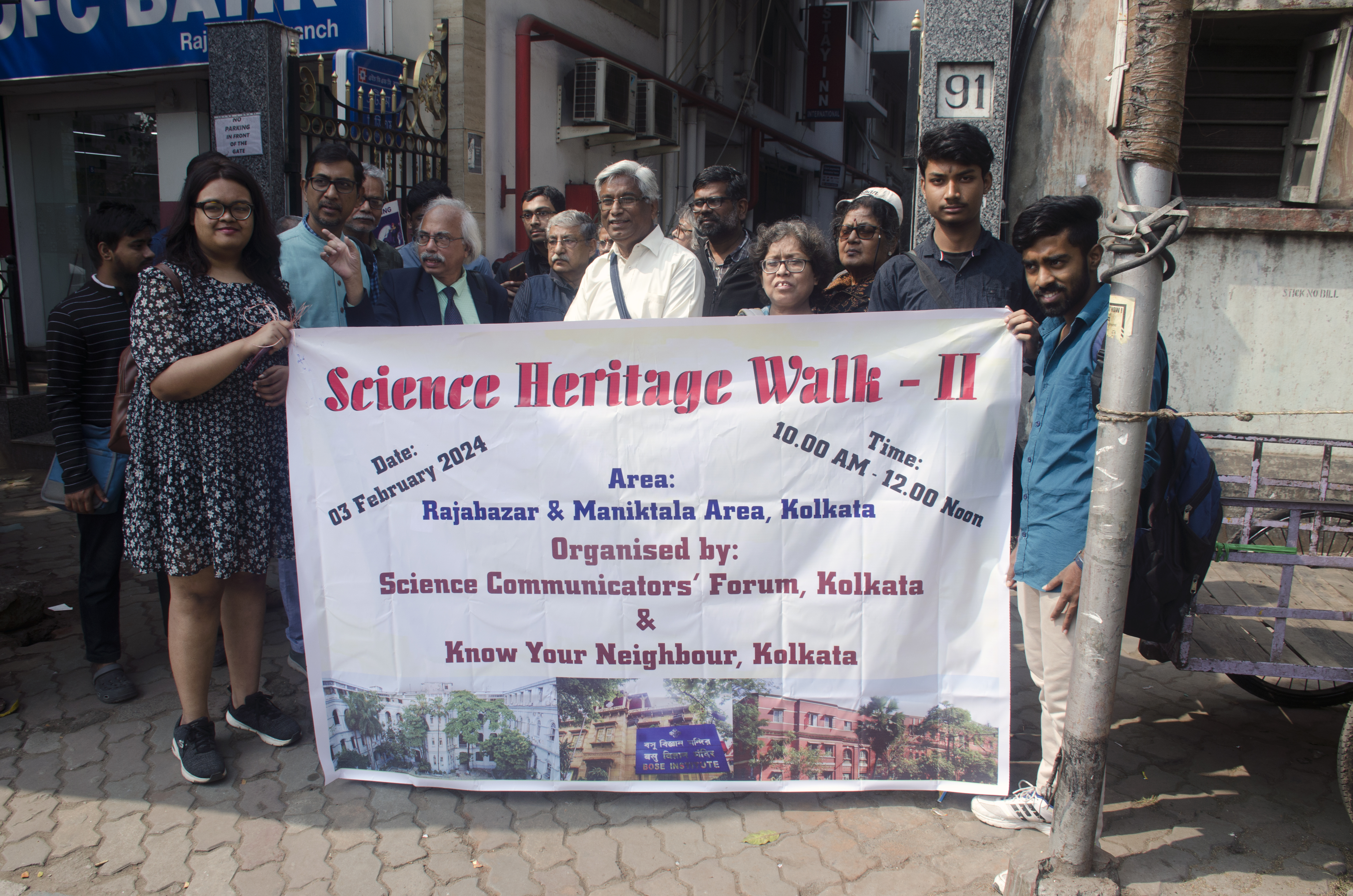
Science walk participants to commemorate National Science Day 2024 at Rajabazar Science College

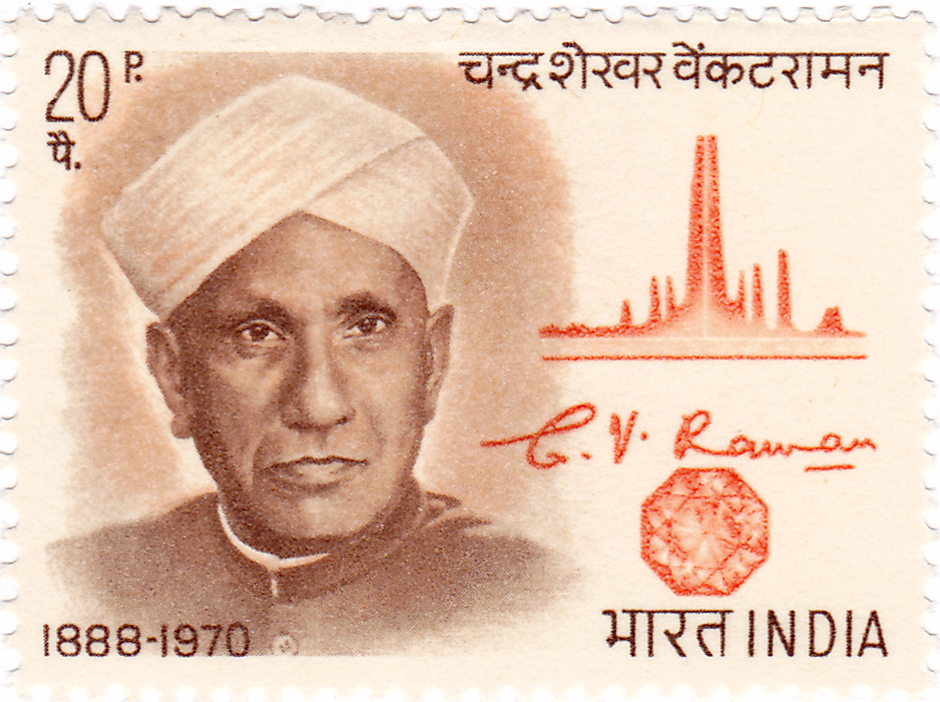
CV Raman 1971 stamp of India

- India celebrates National Science Day on 28 February of every year to commemorate the discovery of the Raman effect in 1928.
- Postal stamps featuring Raman were issued in 1971 and 2009.
- A road in India's capital, New Delhi, is named C. V. Raman Marg.
- An area in eastern Bangalore is called CV Raman Nagar.
- The road running north of the national seminar complex in Bangalore is named C. V. Raman Road.
- A road in Mylapore, Chennai is named CV Raman Road.
- A building at the Indian Institute of Science in Bangalore is named the Raman Building.
- A hospital in eastern Bangalore on 80 Ft. Rd. is named the Sir C. V. Raman Hospital.
- There is also CV Raman Nagar in Trichy, his birthplace.
- Raman, a lunar crater is named after C. V. Raman.
- C. V. Raman Global University was established in 1997.
- In 1998, the American Chemical Society and Indian Association for the Cultivation of Science recognised Raman's discovery as an International Historic Chemical Landmark at the Indian Association for the Cultivation of Science in Jadavpur, Calcutta, India. The inscription on the commemoration plaque reads:
  At this institute, Sir C. V. Raman discovered in 1928 that when a beam of coloured light entered a liquid, a fraction of the light scattered by that liquid was of a different color. Raman showed that the nature of this scattered light was dependent on the type of sample present. Other scientists quickly understood the significance of this phenomenon as an analytical and research tool and called it the Raman Effect. This method became even more valuable with the advent of modern computers and lasers. Its current uses range from the non-destructive identification of minerals to the early detection of life-threatening diseases. For his discovery, Raman was awarded the Nobel Prize in Physics in 1930.
- Dr. C. V. Raman University was established in Chhattisgarh in 2006.
- On 7 November 2013, a Google Doodle honoured Raman on the 125th anniversary of his birthday.
- Raman Science Centre in Nagpur is named after Sir C. V. Raman.
- Dr. C. V. Raman University, Bihar was established in 2018.
- Dr. C. V. Raman University, Khandwa was established in 2018.

== In popular culture ==
- C. V. Raman: The Scientist and His Legacy, a biopic about Raman directed by Nandan Kudhyadi released in 1989. It won the National Film Award for Best Biographical Film.
- Beyond Rainbows: The Quest & Achievement of Dr. C. V. Raman, a documentary film on the physicist directed by Ananya Banerjee aired on Doordarshan, the Indian national public broadcaster, in 2004.
- Rocket Boys, an Indian Hindi-language biographical streaming television series on SonyLIV. The character of C. V. Raman was played by T. M. Karthik.

== See also ==
- Coherent anti-Stokes Raman spectroscopy
- Inverse Raman effect
- Journal of Raman Spectroscopy
- Raman amplification
- Raman laser
- Raman microscope
- Raman optical activity
- Resonance Raman spectroscopy
- Rotating-polarization coherent anti-Stokes Raman spectroscopy
- SHERLOC, a UV Raman spectrometer designed for Mars exploration
- Spatially offset Raman spectroscopy
- Stimulated Raman adiabatic passage
- Surface-enhanced Raman spectroscopy
- Tip-enhanced Raman spectroscopy
- Transmission Raman spectroscopy
- X-ray Raman scattering
- Chandrasekhar family
