= Bernhard Schrader =

German chemist (1931–2012)

- Born: 15 March 1931; Quedlinburg, Germany
- Died: 8 January 2012 (aged 80); Essen, Germany
- Education: Technische Universität Berlin
- Known for: pioneering work in experimental Raman and Infrared Spectroscopy, first practical use of Transmission Raman Spectroscopy in 1967, almost 40 years before that technology became routine practice in chemical analysis, for example for quality control of pharmaceutical products
- Scientific career
- Fields: Raman spectroscopy; Infrared spectroscopy
- Workplaces: Faculty member: University of Dortmund 1971–76; University of Essen 1976–96
- Doctoral advisor: Günther Kresze, Friedrich Nerdel

Bernhard Schrader (15 March 1931 – 8 January 2012) was a German professor of Theoretical and Physical Chemistry and teaching until his retirement in 1996 at the University of Essen, where he died. Schrader was an internationally acclaimed pioneer of experimental molecular spectroscopy in Germany, especially of Raman- and Infrared spectroscopy and its routine application in chemical analysis. Amongst his numerous achievements was his historic landmark paper with Bergmann of 1967 about the first successful use of Transmission Raman spectroscopy for chemical analysis of Organic solids, e.g. pharmaceutical powders, which has become routine industry practice since that approach was "rediscovered" in 2006.

== Life ==
Schrader was born in Quedlinburg and studied chemistry at Technische Universität Berlin. He completed his studies in 1960 with his dissertation, supervised by Friedrich Nerdel (whose own Ph.D. advisor had been Walter Hückel) and his assistant Günther Kresze, who later became professor of organic chemistry at the Technical University of Munich. During that time he wrote, in cooperation with his Ph.D. advisor Friedrich Nerdel, the first edition of his bestselling text book "Lehrbuch der Organischen Chemie" ("Textbook of Organic Chemistry"), which was later known as Bernhard Schrader - "Kurzes Lehrbuch der Organischen Chemie" ("Brief Textbook of Organic Chemistry" 1.-3. edition 1979-1985-2009).

In 1962 Schrader joined the "Institute for Spectrochemistry and Applied Spectroscopy" (ISAS) in Dortmund, at that time led by the physicist Heinrich Kaiser, where he built up and led the molecular spectroscopy department. In 1966 Schrader worked as a post-doc at Florida State University in Tallahassee, in the research group of Earle K. Plyler, at that time one of the leading molecular spectroscopists in the USA.

From 1971 until 1976, Schrader was Professor for Theoretical Organic Chemistry at the University of Dortmund, in 1976 he accepted a tenure as professor for physical and theoretical chemistry at the University of Essen, which he held until his retirement in 1996.

In 1981 Schrader was "visiting scientist" at IBM Research Lab in San Jose, California, in 1984/85 he was a guest professor at Weizmann Institute of Science in Rehovot, Israel.

== Inheritance ==
Schrader published over 300 scientific papers in peer referred journals, and, besides the classic works listed below, two stencils for drawing Stereochemical formulae in 2D and 3D and mathematical formulae. In 1975 four movies were produced with the Institute for Scientific Motion Pictures (IWF) in Göttingen, which demonstrated various types of molecular vibrations.

Schrader was supervisor of 63 doctoral theses, and besides numerous Diploma and Ph.D. candidates from all over the world he hosted five scholars of Alexander von Humboldt Foundation.

For his scientific achievements and also his intense personal involvement on behalf of international scientific cooperation especially with colleagues from Eastern and Southeastern Europe and Turkey Schrader received various awards and honors in Germany and abroad, besides others Schrader was Honorary Member of the Turkish Chemical Society and Member of the scientific-technical class of the Norwegian Academy of Science and Letters.

== Books ==
- Kurzes Lehrbuch der Organischen Chemie, 3. Auflage 2010, De Gruyter, ISBN 978-3-1102-0360-8
- Raman-IR-Atlas of Organic Compounds, 1974, Wiley-VCH, ISBN 978-3-5272-5539-9
- Infrared and Raman Spectroscopy. Methods and Applications, 1995, Wiley-VCH, ISBN 978-3-5272-6446-9

== Movies ==
published by: IWF Göttingen, 1975 ( see: filmarchives-online.eu Search for = “Bernhard Schrader” )

- Vibrations of Free Molecules - 1. Stretching and Bending Vibrations in Ethylene
- Schwingungen freier Moleküle - 2. Schwingungsformen der Methylgruppe in Propen
- Schwingungen freier Moleküle - 3. Schwingungsformen aromatischer Ringe in Melamin
- Oscillations of Molecules in Melamine Crystal Lattices with Hydrogen Bonds
