= Riffler =

Riffler may refer to:

- Riffle splitter, a sampling device used for dividing particulate
- Riffler file, a file that can be used in hard to reach areas
