= Vibrational Spectroscopy =

- Discipline: Spectroscopy
- Language: English
- Edited by: Keith C. Gordon

Publication details
- History: 1990–present
- Publisher: Elsevier (Netherlands)
- Frequency: Bi-monthly
- Impact factor: 3.1 (2025)

Standard abbreviations
- ISO 4: Vib. Spectrosc.

Indexing
- ISSN: 0924-2031

Links
- Journal homepage; Latest issue; All issues

Vibrational Spectroscopy is a bi-monthly peer-reviewed scientific journal covering all aspects of Raman spectroscopy, infrared spectroscopy and near infrared spectroscopy. Publication began in December 1990 under the original editors Jeanette G. Grasselli and John van der Maas. The current editor-in-chief is Keith C. Gordon. In addition to research articles and communications, review articles are also published in the journal.

== Abstracting and indexing ==
The journal is abstracted and indexed in:

- Advanced Polymers Abstracts
- Cambridge Scientific Abstracts
- Ceramic Abstracts/World Ceramics Abstracts
- Chemical Abstracts Service
- Chemistry Citation Index
- ChemWeb
- Civil Engineering Abstracts
- Computer & Information Systems Abstracts
- Computer Information & Technology Abstracts
- Current Contents/Physical, Chemical & Earth Sciences
- Engineered Materials Abstracts
- Inspec
- International Aerospace Abstracts & Database
- Materials Business File
- Materials Information
- Mechanical & Transportation Engineering Abstracts
- METADEX
- Earthquake Engineering Abstracts
- Science Citation Index
- Scopus
- Technology Research Database

According to the Journal Citation Reports, the journal has a 2025 impact factor of 3.1.

== See also ==
- Journal of Raman Spectroscopy
