= P. Krishnamurthy =

P. Krishnamurthy may refer to:

- Krishnamurthy Perumal (born 1943), Indian field hockey player
- Panchapakesa Krishnamurti, Indian scientist and industrialist
- Pochiah Krishnamurthy, Indian cricketer
