= Sample preparation =

Treatment prior to chemical analysis

In analytical chemistry, sample preparation (working-up) refers to the ways in which a sample is treated prior to its analyses. Preparation is a very important step in most analytical techniques, because the techniques are often not responsive to the analyte in its in-situ form, or the results are distorted by interfering species. Sample preparation may involve dissolution, extraction, reaction with some chemical species, pulverizing, treatment with a chelating agent (e.g. EDTA), masking, filtering, dilution, sub-sampling or many other techniques. Treatment is done to prepare the sample into a form ready for analysis by specified analytical equipment. Sample preparation could involve: crushing and dissolution, chemical digestion with acid or alkali, sample extraction, sample clean up and sample pre-concentration.
