= Christy Haynes =

American analytical chemist

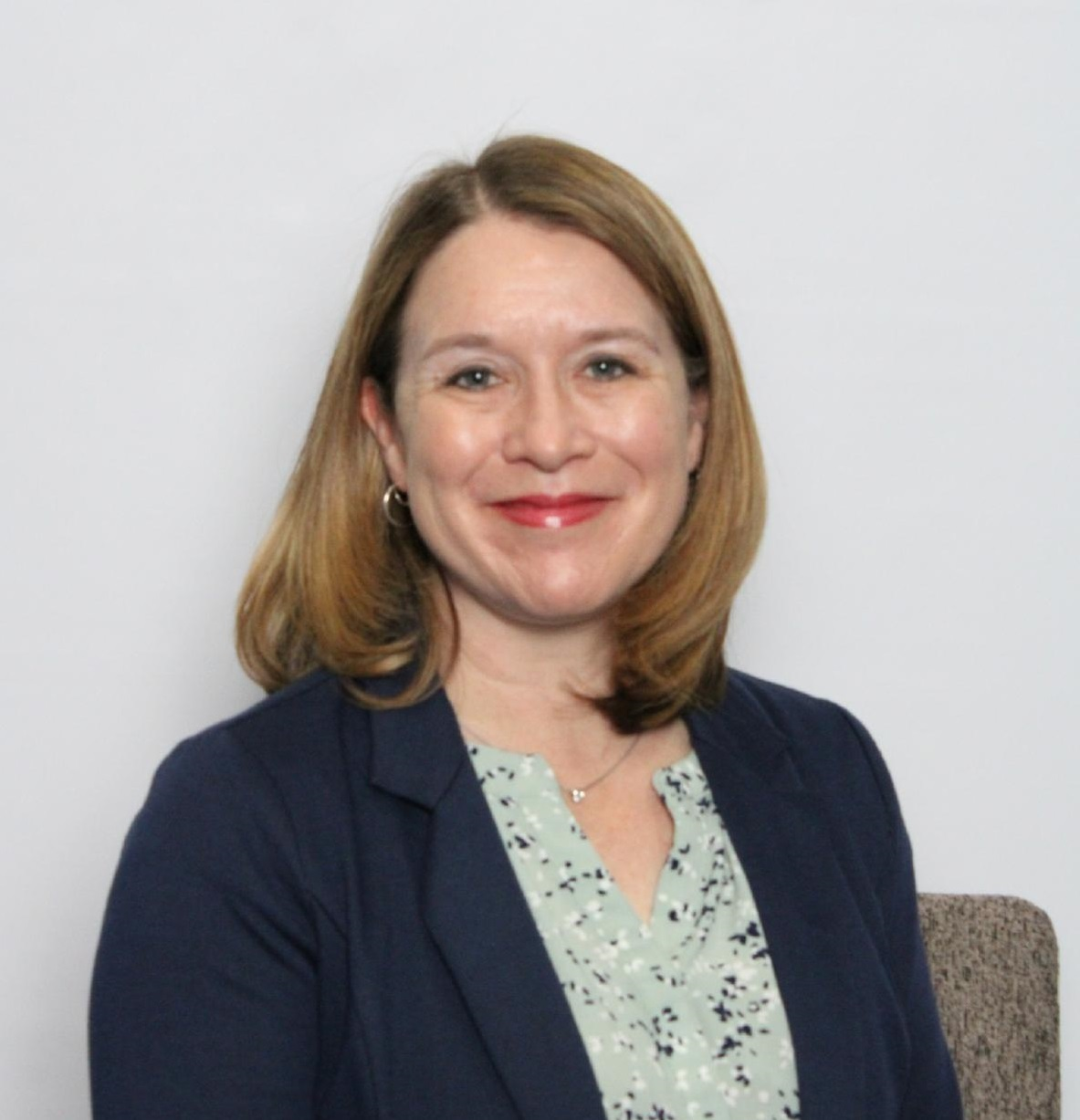
- Pronunciation: /ˈkrɪsti ˈheɪnz/
- Born: July 31, 1977 (age 49); Scottsdale, Arizona, U.S.
- Education: Macalester College (B.A. 1998); Northwestern University (M.S. 1999, Ph.D. 2003)
- Awards: Guggenheim Fellowship (2018); Sloan Fellowship (2010); NIH Director's New Innovator Award (2008)
- Scientific career
- Fields: Chemistry, analytical chemistry, nanotechnology, immunochemistry, toxicology, electrochemistry
- Workplaces: University of North Carolina at Chapel Hill; University of Minnesota
- Thesis: Fundamentals and applications of nanoparticle optics and surface-enhanced Raman scattering (2003)
- Doctoral advisor: Richard P. Van Duyne
- Other academic advisors: R. Mark Wightman
- Website: www1.chem.umn.edu/groups/haynes

Christy Lynn Haynes (born July 31, 1977) is a chemist at the University of Minnesota. She works at the interface of analytical, biological, and nanomaterials chemistry.

== Early life and education ==
Haynes was born in Scottsdale, Arizona, in 1977. She completed her undergraduate work at Macalester College, in 1998 with a major in chemistry and minors in mathematics and Spanish. She completed her postbaccalaureate work at Northwestern University completing a master's degree in 1999 and a Ph.D. in 2003 under the direction of Richard P. Van Duyne. Her dissertation, "Fundamentals and Applications of Nanoparticle Optics and Surface-Enhanced Raman Scattering," demonstrated how Surface-enhanced Raman spectroscopy could be used as a small molecule biosensor. She was awarded the Northwestern University prize for Excellence in Graduate Research in 2002. Haynes completed post-doctoral work at University of North Carolina Chapel Hill in 2005 in the lab of R. Mark Wightman. She has described Hilary Godwin, then professor at Northwestern University, as one of her influences.

== Career ==
After her PhD, Haynes worked with Mark Wightman as a postdoctoral fellow at the University of North Carolina at Chapel Hill. There she worked on microelectrode amperometry to study single-cell exocytosis.

Haynes joined the University of Minnesota in 2005 as an assistant professor. She was promoted to full professor in 2014 and became the Elmore H. Northey Professor of Chemistry in 2015. Haynes has been the associate head of department of chemistry since 2015. She became a Distinguished McKnight University Professor in 2019.

In 2012, Haynes helped establish the Center for Sustainable Nanotechnology, which researches the transformations and interactions of consumer or industrial nanomaterials in the environment. Since 2012, Haynes has been the associate director of the Center for Sustainable Nanotechnology. As part of this effort, Haynes helps author the blog Sustainable Nano, where she has contributed posts on diversity in the sciences and science communication.

In 2017 she delivered a TED talk, "Nanomaterials are everywhere; how do we make them safe?". Haynes was named in The Analytical Scientist Power List in 2016, 2017, and 2019. In 2017, 2018, and 2019, Haynes was named a finalist for the Blavatnik National Awards for Young Scientists. In 2018, she was awarded a Guggenheim Fellowship, which enabled her to work in the Technical University of Valencia characterizing nanomaterials in an environmental matrix. She delivered a second TED talk in 2022 entitled "How nanoparticles can help solve the global food crisis".

Haynes is an advocate for increased diversity in the chemical sciences. She takes part in outreach activities to encourage young people to consider careers in chemistry. She is a lead presenter for the University of Minnesota Energy and U program, which brings over ten thousand third grade students to her campus each year. Haynes is a member of the advisory board for Open Chemical Collaborative in Diversity Equity (OXIDE).

Haynes is passionate about her role as a mentor and advisor to students—telling Northwestern University in an alumni spotlight in 2020,

"Professionally, my CV does not really reveal the great pride and honor I feel to work with the undergraduate and graduate students who join my laboratory or collaborate with my group. Each of those students has a story about how they arrived in chemistry, the challenges they’ve overcome, and the skills that they are currently working on to become even better. I love learning these stories and being a part of them."

Haynes has been recognized for her mentoring and advising efforts. The University of Minnesota Graduate and Professional Student Assembly awarded her the Advising and Mentoring Award in 2015 and the University of Minnesota gave her the 2013 Outstanding Postdoctoral Mentor Award.

== Research ==
Her lab, the Haynes Research Group, applies analytical chemistry and nanomaterials to biomedicine, ecology and toxicology. Nanoparticles are increasingly being used in manufacturing, which will result in them ending up in the ecosystem with unknown consequences. The Haynes group look to determine the molecular design rules for nanoparticle toxicity, through material design and fabrication and characterization both in the lab and in the food web. They characterize chemical messenger synthesis and exocytosis using laser spectroscopy and microelectrochemistry. In 2012, her group was the first ever to successfully measure real-time chemical messenger delivery from individual blood platelets. In 2013, her research was discussed on Minnesota Public Radio.

=== Publications and journal contributions ===
==== As author ====
Haynes has published over 200 peer-reviewed articles in scientific journals.

==== As editor ====
Since 2016, she has served as an associate editor of academic journal Analytical Chemistry, and in 2018 became the curator of feature articles and perspectives for the journal. She was on the editorial board of Analytical Chemistry from 2013 to 2016 prior to becoming an editor. Haynes was the vice editor in chief of the journal Environmental Science: Nano from 2013 to 2015. She currently sits on the editorial advisory boards of a number of academic journals, including Journal of Raman Spectroscopy since 2009, Chemical Science since 2010, The Analyst since 2010, Chemical Research in Toxicology since 2013, Environmental Science: Nano since 2016, ACS Nano since 2020, and Nanoscale and Nanoscale Advances since 2020

==== Patents ====
Haynes holds three patents:

- Surface-enhanced Raman nanobiosensor (2013)
- Porous silica having high pore volume and methods of making and using the same (2018)
- Mesoporous silica-coated nanoparticles (2019)

== Honors and awards ==
- 2002 Presidential Fellowship from Northwestern University
- 2003 Award for Excellence in Graduate Research from Northwestern University
- 2004 Ruth L. Kirschstein National Research Service Award Postdoctoral Fellowship from the National Institutes of Health
- 2005 Victor K. LaMer Award from the American Chemical Society Division of Colloid and Surface Science
- 2005 Nobel Laureate Signature Award for Graduate Education in Chemistry from the American Chemical Society
- 2006 3M Nontenured Faculty Award
- 2006 Kinship Foundation Searle Scholar
- 2006 National Science Foundation CAREER Award
- 2007 Delegate for Japan-U.S. Young Researchers Exchange on Nanotechnology
- 2007–2009 University of Minnesota McKnight Land-Grant Assistant Professor
- 2008 National Institutes of Health New Innovator
- 2009 Camille and Henry Dreyfus Teacher-Scholar
- 2009 Society for Electroanalytical Chemistry Young Investigator
- 2010 Alfred P. Sloan Fellow
- 2010 Arthur F. Findeis Award for Achievements by a Young Analytical Scientist from the American Chemical Society Division of Analytical Chemistry
- 2011 Royal Society of Chemistry Joseph Black Award
- 2012 Pittsburgh Conference Achievement Award
- 2013 Kavli Foundation Emerging Leader in Chemistry Lecture
- 2014 University of Minnesota Taylor Award for Distinguished Research
- 2015 University of Minnesota Sara Evans Faculty Woman Scholar/Leader Award
- 2015 Advising and Mentoring Award from the University of Minnesota Graduate and Professional Student Assembly
- 2016 The Analytical Scientist’s 2016 Power List of top 50 talented women scientists
- 2017 Institute on the Environment Fellow
- 2018 Royal Society of Chemistry Theophilus Redwood Award
- 2018 Coblentz Society Craver Award
- 2018 Guggenheim Fellowship
- 2019 Distinguished McKnight University Professor
- 2023 The Analytical Scientist the Power List - Mentors and Educators
