= Journal of Earth System Science =

- Discipline: Earth system science
- Language: English
- Edited by: Prof. Somnath Dasgupta

Publication details
- Former name(s): Proceedings of the Indian Academy of Sciences (Earth and Planetary Sciences)
- History: 1978–2004
- Publisher: Springer Science+Business Media on behalf of the Indian Academy of Sciences (India)
- Frequency: Bimonthly
- Impact factor: 1.912 (2021)

Standard abbreviations
- ISO 4: J. Earth Syst. Sci.

Indexing
- ISSN: 0253-4126 (print); 0973-774X (web)

Links
- Journal homepage; Online archive

The Journal of Earth System Science is a peer-reviewed scientific journal covering Earth system science. It was established in 1978 and is published by Springer Science+Business Media on behalf of the Indian Academy of Sciences. The editor-in-chief is Prof. Somnath Dasgupta (Emeritus Professor).

== History ==
The journal was originally part of the Proceedings of the Indian Academy of Sciences. This journal was established in 1934, but in 1978 it was split into three different journals: Proceedings of the Indian Academy of Sciences (Earth and Planetary Sciences), Journal of Chemical Sciences, and Proceedings of the Indian Academy of Sciences - Mathematical Sciences. In 2005, Proceedings of the Indian Academy of Sciences (Earth and Planetary Sciences) was renamed as Journal of Earth System Science.

== Abstracting and indexing ==
The journal is abstracted and indexed in:

- Science Citation Index Expanded
- Scopus
- Astrophysics Data System
- Chemical Abstracts Service
- EBSCO databases
- CAB International
- Academic OneFile
- CAB Abstracts
- Current Contents/Physical, Chemical and Earth Sciences
- GeoRef
- Global Health
- INIS Atomindex
- PASCAL
- Petroleum Abstracts

According to the Journal Citation Reports, the journal has a 2021 impact factor of 1.912
