= N. C. Krishna Aiyar =

Indian physicist

N. C. Krishna Aiyar was an Indian physicist who was elected as one of the first Fellows of the American Physical Society in 1921.

== Career ==
During 1918 and 1919, Aiyar worked at the Calcutta School of Physical Sciences under the guidance of physicist C. V. Raman. He was among the researchers from other Indian universities who came to Calcutta to work under Raman during this period.

The 1928 Handbook of Indian Universities listed Aiyar as a member of the physics faculty at Rangoon University in Burma (now Myanmar). The entry identified him as "N. C. Krishna Aiyar, M.A., I.E.S." and stated that university professors received an honorarium of 300 rupees per month.
