= Proceedings - Mathematical Sciences =

- Discipline: Mathematics
- Language: English
- Edited by: Parameswaran Sankaran

Publication details
- Former name: Proceedings of the Indian Academy of Sciences – Mathematical Sciences
- History: 1934–present
- Publisher: Springer Science+Business Media on behalf of the Indian Academy of Sciences (India)
- Frequency: Upon acceptance
- Impact factor: 0.272 (2019)

Standard abbreviations
- ISO 4: Proc.: Math. Sci.
- MathSciNet: Proc. Indian Acad. Sci. Math. Sci.

Indexing
- CODEN: PIAMDO
- ISSN: 0253-4142 (print); 0973-7685 (web)
- LCCN: 85644803
- OCLC no.: 462722435

Links
- Journal homepage; Online archive

Proceedings - Mathematical Sciences is a peer-reviewed scientific journal that covers current research in mathematics. Papers in pure and applied areas are also published on the basis of the mathematical content. It is published by Springer Science+Business Media on behalf of the Indian Academy of Sciences. The editor-in-chief is Parameswaran Sankaran (Chennai Mathematical Institute).

== History ==
The journal was originally part of the Proceedings of the Indian Academy of Sciences. This journal was established in 1934, but in 1978 it was split into three different journals: Proceedings of the Indian Academy of Sciences – Mathematical Sciences, Journal of Earth System Science, and Journal of Chemical Sciences, all of them continuing as "volume 87". The journal was later renamed as Proceedings - Mathematical Sciences.

== Abstracting and indexing ==
The journal is abstracted and indexed in:

- Science Citation Index Expanded
- Scopus
- Zentralblatt Math
- EBSCO databases
- Academic OneFile
- Academic Search
- Current Index to Statistics
- EI-Compendex
- Indian Science Abstracts
- INIS Atomindex
- Mathematical Reviews

According to the Journal Citation Reports, the journal has a 2019 impact factor of 0.272.
