= Transmission Raman spectroscopy =

Transmission Raman spectroscopy (TRS) is a variant of Raman spectroscopy which is advantageous in probing bulk content of diffusely scattering samples. Although it was demonstrated in the early days of Raman spectroscopy it was not exploited in practical settings until much later, probably due to limitations of technology at the time. It was rediscovered in 2006, where the authors showed that it was capable of allowing Raman spectroscopy through many millimetres of tabletted or powdered samples. In addition, this research has also identified several highly beneficial analytical properties of this approach, including the ability to probe bulk content of powders and tissue in the absence of subsampling and to reject Raman and fluorescence components originating from the surface of the sample.

== Theory ==
Transmission Raman is possible because light scatters through turbid materials that do not significantly absorb or block the light. By a similar mechanism to spatially offset Raman spectroscopy, the light in a diffusely scattering sample spreads through the object randomly (Transmission Raman can be regarded as an extreme example of SORS). As Raman photons can be created at all points that the light passes through the total scrambled Raman signal measured on the opposite face of the object is highly representative of the bulk of the material. This desirable property removes a problem with conventional, widely used back-scattering Raman spectroscopy where the signal tends to be representative of the surface and near-surface composition. Because Raman spectroscopy does not rely on absorption and the light spreads throughout the sample, a large thickness can be measured in the absence of photon absorption. This produces an analysis representative of the entire mixture and is typically insensitive to coatings, or thin containers.

== Pharmaceutical applications ==
Transmission Raman lends itself to rapid, non-invasive and non-destructive analysis of pharmaceutical dosage forms such as capsules and tablets. This addresses several limitations of traditional pharmaceutical assay techniques including limitations due to surface sensitivity (e.g., reflectance NIR), the presence of phase changes due to sample preparation (liquid chromatography) or sub-sampling (conventional Raman, NIR). Transmission Raman is largely insensitive to surface, requires no sample preparation, involves no phase change and is rapid. Transmission Raman spectroscopy of pharmaceutical tablets and capsules was first demonstrated by Matousek and Parker. Subsequent research established the technique’s accuracy and applicability to quantifying tablet and production-style capsule formulations.

Pharmaceutical tablets and capsules are typically composed of a combination of APIs and excipients, each of which will produce a Raman spectral component with a relative intensity proportional to the ingredient concentrations. Analysing Raman spectra to produce assay results requires a method to separate the individual spectral components and correlate their intensity contributions with a relative concentration measure. This is typically facilitated using chemometric analysis methods.

Transmission Raman spectroscopy can be used as a process analytical technology (PAT) tool for the detection of physical state of the API and for obtaining qualitative and quantitative information about the composition.

== Medical applications ==
The use of Raman spectroscopy in medical applications has been limited to depths of hundreds of micrometres (confocal Raman). Transmission Raman has been demonstrated as a potential diagnostic tool for lesions in breast tissue.
