= Micro-spatially offset Raman spectroscopy =

Micro-spatially offset Raman spectroscopy (micro-SORS) is an analytical technique developed in 2014 that combines SORS with microscopy. The technique derives its sublayer‐resolving properties from its parent technique SORS. The main difference between SORS and micro-SORS is the spatial resolution: while SORS is suited to the analysis of millimetric layers, micro-SORS is able to resolve thin, micrometric-scale layers. Similarly to SORS technique, micro-SORS is able to preferentially collect the Raman photons generated under the surface in turbid (diffusely scattering) media. In this way, it is possible to reconstruct the chemical makeup of micrometric multi-layered turbid system in a non destructive way. Micro-SORS is particularly useful when dealing with precious or unique objects as for Cultural Heritage field and Forensic Science or in biomedical applications, where a non-destructive molecular characterization constitute a great advantage.

To date, micro-SORS has been mainly used to characterize biological materials such as bones, blood, and Cultural Heritage materials, especially paint stratigraphies. Other materials have been studied with this technique including polymers, industrial paper and wheat seeds.

Micro-SORS was developed on a conventional micro-Raman instrument, and portable micro-SORS prototypes are currently under further optimization to enable in-situ measurements and avoid the need of sampling.

== Working principle ==
In turbid media, the depth‐resolving power of confocal Raman microscopy is restricted due to the optical proprieties of these materials. In such materials, Raman photons generated at different depths emerge on the surface after a certain number of scattering events. The Raman photons generated in the sub-surface emerge on the surface laterally compared to the incident light position, and this displacement is statistically proportional with the depth the Raman photon was generated at. Micro-SORS permits to preferentially collect these displaced photons coming from the sub-surface by enlarging (defocusing) or separating laser excitation and collection zones (Full micro-SORS).

== Micro-SORS key-modalities ==
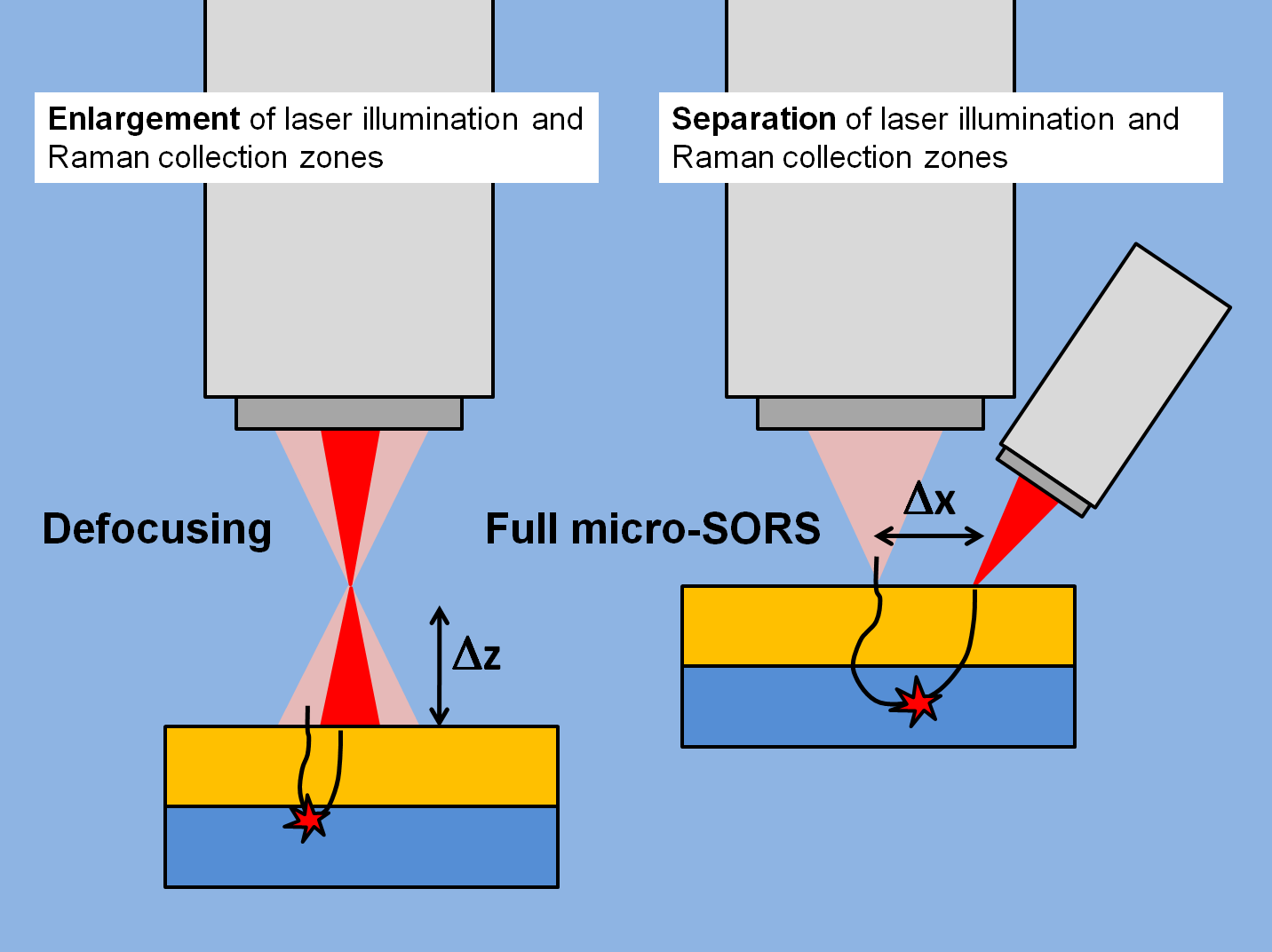
Micro-SORS key-modalities

=== Defocusing micro-SORS ===
Defocusing is the most basic variant of the technique and it does not provide a complete separation between excitation and collection zones, rendering this variant less effective. Nonetheless, defocused measurements have the great advantage to be easily performed with a conventional micro-Raman without any hardware nor software modifications. Defocusing consists in the enlargement of the excitation and the collection zones that is achieved by moving the microscope objective out of focus (Δz movements) from the surface of the object or sample under analysis. The Δz movements range goes typically from few tens to two millimeters, depending on the numbers and thicknesses of the materials.

=== Full micro-SORS ===
This more sophisticated micro-SORS variant provides a complete separation of laser excitation and collection zones (Δx offset) that requires a hardware or a software modification to a conventional Raman microscope. The separation can be achieved by using an external probe or fibre optics to deliver the laser, by displacing the laser spot by moving the beam-steer alignment mirrors, by using a spatially resolved CCD, by using a digital micro-mirror device (DMD), by moving the tip of the Raman detection fibre to perform an off-confocal detection of the signal or by combining hyperspectral SORS and defocusing micro-SORS. Full micro-SORS was proven to be more effective in terms of both penetration depth into the sample and relative enhancement of sublayer signal

== Layers system reconstruction ==
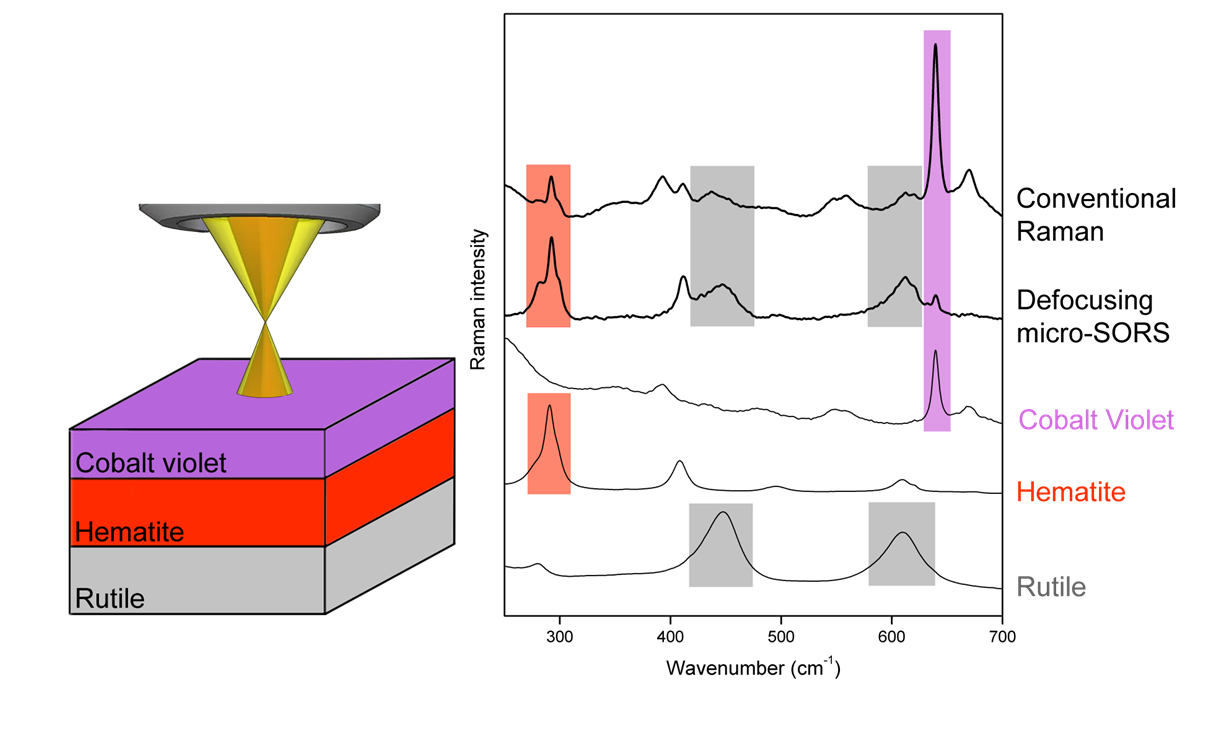
Layers make-up reconstruction using defocusing.

To reconstruct the micro-layer succession it is required to collect a conventional Raman spectrum and at least a one micro-SORS spectrum; the acquisition of several spectra at gradually increasing defocusing distances or spatial offsets is usually the best way to approach unknown materials. A comparison among the acquired spectra allows achieving the layers composition: in defocused of spatially offset spectra, the signals of the sub-surface layers appear or are intensified compared to the surface signal. Data treatment as spectra normalization or subtraction is commonly used to better visualize the layer sequence.

The layers' thickness can be estimated after calibration on a well characterized sample set with a known thickness.

== Micro-SORS in art ==
Non-destructivity is a major goal for Conservation Scientist, due to the intrinsic value of Cultural Heritage objects. Micro-SORS was developed to address the need of a non-destructive analytical technique with high chemical specificity for the non-destructive analysis of thin painted layers. In painted artworks, the painted film is typically obtained superimposing turbid thin (micrometric-scale) pigmented layers, and their chemical characterization is essential to detect the presence of degradation products, to gain information about the artistic technique and for datation and authentication purposes. To date, Micro-SORS was successfully used to characterize the paint stratigraphy in polychrome sculptures, painted plasters., painted cards and contemporary street art mural paintings

== See also ==
- Cultural Heritage
- Conservation Science
- Biomedicine
- Forensic Scienze
- Raman Spectroscopy
