= Dr. C.V. Raman University, Bihar =

Private University in Bihar

- Established: 2018
- Affiliations: UGC
- Chancellor: Arvind Chaturvedi
- Vice-Chancellor: Dr. Samit Tiwari
- Location: Bhagwanpur, Bihar, India
- Website: www.cvrubihar.ac.in

Dr. C.V. Raman University, Bihar (CVRU) is a state private university located at Bhagwanpur in Vaishali district, Bihar, India. The university was established in 2018 by the All India Society for Electronics & Computer Technology (AISECT) under the Bihar Private Universities Act, 2013, the fourth of six private universities planned in Bihar, following the first two private universities, K. K. University and Sandip University, Sijoul and later Amity University, Patna. The Bihar Cabinet approved the University on 10 January 2018, notified in the gazette on 7 February 2018 and the university became active in the July 2018 session. The university offers various diploma, undergraduate and postgraduate courses in five faculties. It is named after the first Nobel Laureate of the country, C.V. Raman.

== Academics ==
The institute offers diploma, undergraduate, and postgraduate courses through five faculties:

- Faculty of Commerce and Management
- Faculty of Arts & Humanities
- Faculty of Science
- Faculty of Computer Science & IT
- Faculty of Agriculture

HoD: Santosh Kumar

- Faculty of Engineering and Technology

Department of Political Science

HoD: Manish Ranjan
