= Uma Parameswaran =

Indo-Canadian professor and writer (born 1938)

- Born: 1938 (age 87–88) Madras, Madras Presidency, British India (now Chennai, Tamil Nadu, India)
- Occupation: Professor, writer, editor
- Education: Jabalpur University (B.A.); Nagpur University (M.A.); Indiana University Bloomington (M.A.)
- Alma mater: Michigan State University (Ph.D.)
- Literary movement: South Asian Canadian Literature

Uma Parameswaran (born 1938) is an Indo-Canadian writer, scholar, and literary critic. Her writing includes works of fiction and poetry, as well as plays and nonfiction. She is a retired professor of English at the University of Winnipeg.

== Early life and education ==
Parameswaran was born in 1938 in Madras, Madras Presidency, British India (now Chennai, Tamil Nadu, India). She was raised in a Tamil home in Jabalpur, a city in Central Provinces and Berar (present-day Madhya Pradesh).

She completed her B.A. at Jabalpur University and a master's degree in journalism at Nagpur University. With a Fulbright grant, she completed a master's degree in creative writing at Indiana University Bloomington. In 1972, she completed a doctorate in English at Michigan State University.

== Career ==
Parameswaran has written fiction, poetry, drama and literary criticism. Her poetry includes the 1973 collection Cyclic Hope, Cyclic Pain, published by the Writers Workshop in Calcutta, the 1988 collection Trishanku, and the 2002 collection Sisters at the Well.

She wrote the play Sons Must Die in 1962, and her other plays include Meera (1971), Sita's Promise (1981), Rootless but Green are the Boulevard Trees (1987) and Dear Deedi, My Sister (1989), which were collected in Sons Must Die and Other Plays in 1998 as part of the South Asian Canadian Literature Series (SACLIT) that Parameswaran created and edited.

What Was Always Hers, published in 1999, was her first collection of prose fiction, consisting of four short stories and a novella. In 2001, her novella The Sweet Smell of Mother's Milk-Wet Bodice was published. She has also written three novels: Mangoes on the Maple Tree, published in 2002, Cycle of the Moon, published in 2010, and Maru and the Maple Leaf, published in 2016.

Her work includes biographies of CV Raman and his wife, Lady Lokosundarai Raman.

She was also a professor of English at the University of Winnipeg.

== Critical reception ==
=== Fiction ===
In a review of the collection What Was Always Hers, Debbie Keahey writes for Herizons, "Parameswaran's writing is at its strongest in describing women's relationships with their children and spouses, and the combination of tenderness and misunderstanding often involved." In a review for World Literature Today, James Gerein describes the novel Mangoes on the Maple Tree as "largely a success, for it gives us a glimpse into the lives of a recent immigrant family and how they feel about their new home as well as the tensions among themselves." In a review of the novel Maru and the Maple Leaf, Nilambri Ghai writes in Montreal Serai, "Parameswaran is very skilled in exploring centuries of relationships and bringing them together to a place in time that transcends a linear, chronological sequence of events."

Susheela Rao writes in World Literature Today that The Sweet Smell of Mother's Milk-Wet Bodice "is the common tale of an Indian girl, naive and accustomed to living in a joint family, now exposed to a foreign culture and environment" and in the novella, "Parameswaran skillfully depicts the condition of such women." In Canadian Literature, Kuldip Gill writes, "Adaptation to a new country doesn't just produce a hybrid life, but rather a double consciousness, and a very deeply felt change of identity. Parameswaran could have shown us more depth in the crisis felt by [the protagonist] Namita, caught in an unjust world." Wendy Robbins writes in Herizons that The Sweet Smell of Mother's Milk-Wet Bodice "belongs to the genres of engagé literature, roman à thèse and feminist fiction" and "Parameswaran demonstrates that new social paradigms are possible and reminds us that feminists, despite the hype, have an extraordinary sense of humour."

=== Poetry ===
In a review of the poetry collection Sisters at the Well, John Oliver Perry writes in World Literature Today, "As in Trishanku, the main persona here clearly presents experiences, attitudes, and issues of a civically and academically active Indian-born woman happily married to an Indian man, attempting to accommodate to Canadian – more specifically Manitoban – life culturally and climatically, and raising their child to have some honest feelings like their own about India and about their probably always less than fully accepted, racially marked place in Canadian multicultural society." In Negotiation of Home and Homelessness: The Immigrant in Uma Parameswaran's Poetry in the South Asian Review, Minakshi Kaushik writes, "Against theories that see immigration as an eagerness to get assimilated, Paramswaran's poetry develops immigration as an experience that undergoes painful phases of nostalgia, alienation from Canadian culture, and the desire for grounding the self as subject in the erstwhile unfamiliar soil."

=== Plays ===
In a review of Rootless But Green Are the Boulevard Trees for Canadian Literature Alan Filewood writes, "When first published in 1987 (some years in fact after it was written), Parameswaran's play was a groundbreaking and effective dramatic slice of life about an immigrant family in Winnipeg [...] it was the emergence of South Asian voices in Canadian drama that was significant. The canon shifted." In a review of Rootless But Green Are the Boulevard Trees for Canadian Review of Materials, Harriet Zaidman writes, "Despite the specific references the characters make to India and their heritage, plus some references to dated events and expressions that are no longer in common usage, the challenges these characters face apply to every group that has immigrated to this country in the past and at the present time" and that the play "would be an effective catalyst for discussion in today's high schools which are full of youth from every continent."

In a Language in India review, Lidwina. E. Pereira describes Sita's Promise as "a play which links epic India with modern Canada through myth and dance" and "elucidates upon the celebration of Indian art traditions and familiarizing its richness to the children born in Canada and other Canadians." According to R. Vedavalli, in Critical Essays on Canadian Literature, "The promise of Sita, "I through my people, shall surely come again and we shall build our temple and sing our songs with all the children to all the different countries who make this their home" symbolizes Uma Parameswaran's vision of Canada, as a mosaic of cultures."

=== Nonfiction ===
In a review of Kamala Markandaya, B. Hariharan writes in World Literature Today, "In an astute manner, the critic speaks of three distinct kinds of readers and their readings of Markandaya: Indians who have settled abroad, Indians living in India, and non-Indians. The division appears to be too neat, but she sticks to her "metacriticism," which is quite illuminating." In a review of Quilting a New Canon: Stitching Women's Words in the NWSA Journal, Shelley Lucas writes of the essay collection edited and introduced by Parameswaran that "each of the essays represents at least one of the three types of processes Parameswaran deems necessary for revising a canon: retrieving, recording, and re-reading" and the book offers "a sample of how feminists are interacting with communities, and, as a result, are revising the canons of other disciplines."

== Selected works ==
=== Fiction, poetry, and plays ===
- Cyclic Hope, Cyclic Pain, Writers Workshop (Calcutta, India), 1973. OCLC 1529139
- Rootless But Green Are the Boulevard Trees, TSAR (Toronto, Canada), 1987, ISBN 9780920661031, 2007, ISBN 9781894770354.
- Trishanku, TSAR (Toronto, Canada), 1988, ISBN 9780920661048.
- The Door I Shut Behind Me: Selected Fiction, Poetry and Drama, Affiliated East-West Press (Madras, India), 1990, ISBN 9788185336350, (includes "The Door I Shut Behind Me"; "Trishanku"; "Rootless But Green Are the Boulevard Trees")
- (Editor) SACLIT: An Introduction to South Asian-Canadian Literature. EastWest Books, (Madras, India), 1996.
- SACLIT Drama: Plays by South Asian Canadians, IBH Prakashana (Bangalore, India), 1996, OCLC 37580056, (includes "Meera"; "Sita's Promise"; "Rootless But Green Are the Boulevard Trees").
- Sons Must Die and Other Plays, Prestige Books (New Delhi, India), 1998, ISBN 9788175510203, (includes "Sons Must Die"; "Meera"; "Sita's Promise"; "Dear Deedi, my Sister"; "Rootless But Green Are the Boulevard Trees").
- Trishanku and Other Writings, Prestige Books (New Delhi, India), 1998.
- What Was Always Hers, Broken Jaw Press (Fredericton, Canada), 1999, ISBN 9781896647128.
- The Sweet Smell of Mother's Milk-Wet Bodice, Broken Jaw Press (Fredericton, Canada), 2001, ISBN 9781896647722, 2006, ISBN 9780973382174.
- Mangoes on the Maple Tree, Broken Jaw Press (Fredericton, Canada), 2002, ISBN 9781896647791.
- Sisters at the Well, Indialog (New Delhi, India), 2002. ISBN 9788187981145
- Sons Must Die, Alexander Street Press (Alexandria, United States), 2003, OCLC 137351205.
- Sita's Promise, Alexander Street Press (Alexandria, United States), 2004, OCLC 181089504.
- Riding High with Krishna and a Baseball Bat, iUniverse (Lincoln, NE), 2006.
- The Forever Banyan Tree, Larkuma (Winnipeg, Canada), 2007.
- Fighter Pilots Never Die, Larkuma (Winnipeg, Canada), 2007.
- A Cycle of the Moon: a novel, TSAR Publications, (Toronto, Canada), 2010, ISBN 9781894770620.
- Maru and the Maple Leaf, Larkuma (Winnipeg, Canada), 2016

=== Nonfiction ===
- A Study of Representative Indo-English Novelists, Vikas Publishing House (New Delhi, India), 1976, ISBN 9780706904109.
- (Editor) The Commonwealth in Canada: Proceedings of the Second Triennial Conference of CACLALS, University of Winnipeg, 1–4 October 1981, Writers Workshop (Calcutta, India), 1983.
- The Perforated Sheet: Essays on Salman Rushdie's Art, Affiliated East-West Press (New Delhi, India), 1988, ISBN 9788185095936.
- (Editor) Quilting a New Canon: Stitching Women's Words, Sister Vision (Toronto, Ontario, Canada), 1996, ISBN 9781896705064.
- Kamala Markandaya, Rawat Publications (Jaipur, India), 2000, OCLC 43853159.
- Salman Rushdie's Early Fiction, Rawat Publications (Jaipur, India), 2007, ISBN 9788131600726
- Writing the Diaspora: Essays on Cul[t]ure and Identity, Rawat Publications (Jaipur, India), 2007. ISBN 9788131600733

== Honors and awards ==
- 2000 Canadian Authors' Association Jubilee Award for short fiction (What Was Always Hers)
- 2010 nomination for Canadian Book of the Year award (A Cycle of the Moon)

== Personal life ==
Parameswaran moved to Winnipeg in 1966, after she married. She has one daughter.

Parameswaran is related to both CV Raman and Subramaniam Chandrasekhar.
