= Sub-sampling (chemistry) =

Analytical chemistry sampling procedure

In analytical chemistry, sub-sampling is a procedure by which a small, representative sample is taken from a larger sample. Good sub-sampling technique becomes important when the large sample is not homogeneous.

== Techniques ==
=== Coning and quartering ===
Coning and quartering is a method used by analytical chemists to reduce the sample size of a powder without creating a systematic bias. The technique involves pouring the sample so that it takes on a conical shape, and then flattening it out into a cake. The cake is then divided into quarters; the two quarters which sit opposite one another are discarded, while the other two are combined and constitute the reduced sample. The same process is continued until an appropriate sample size remains. Analyses are made with respect to the sample left behind.

=== Riffle box splitting ===
A riffle box is a box containing a number (between 3 and 12) of "chutes" - slotted paths through which particles of the sample may slide. The sample is dropped into the top, and the box produces two equally divided subsamples. Riffle boxes are commonly used in mining to reduce the size of crushed rock samples prior to assaying.
