= P. Krishnamurti =

Indian industrialist from Bangalore, Karnataka

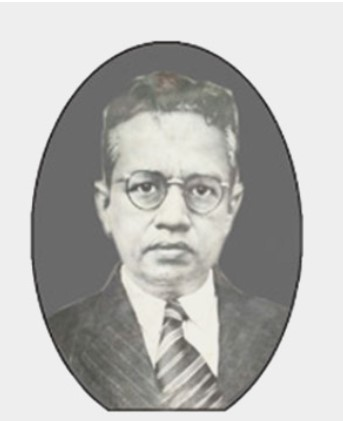

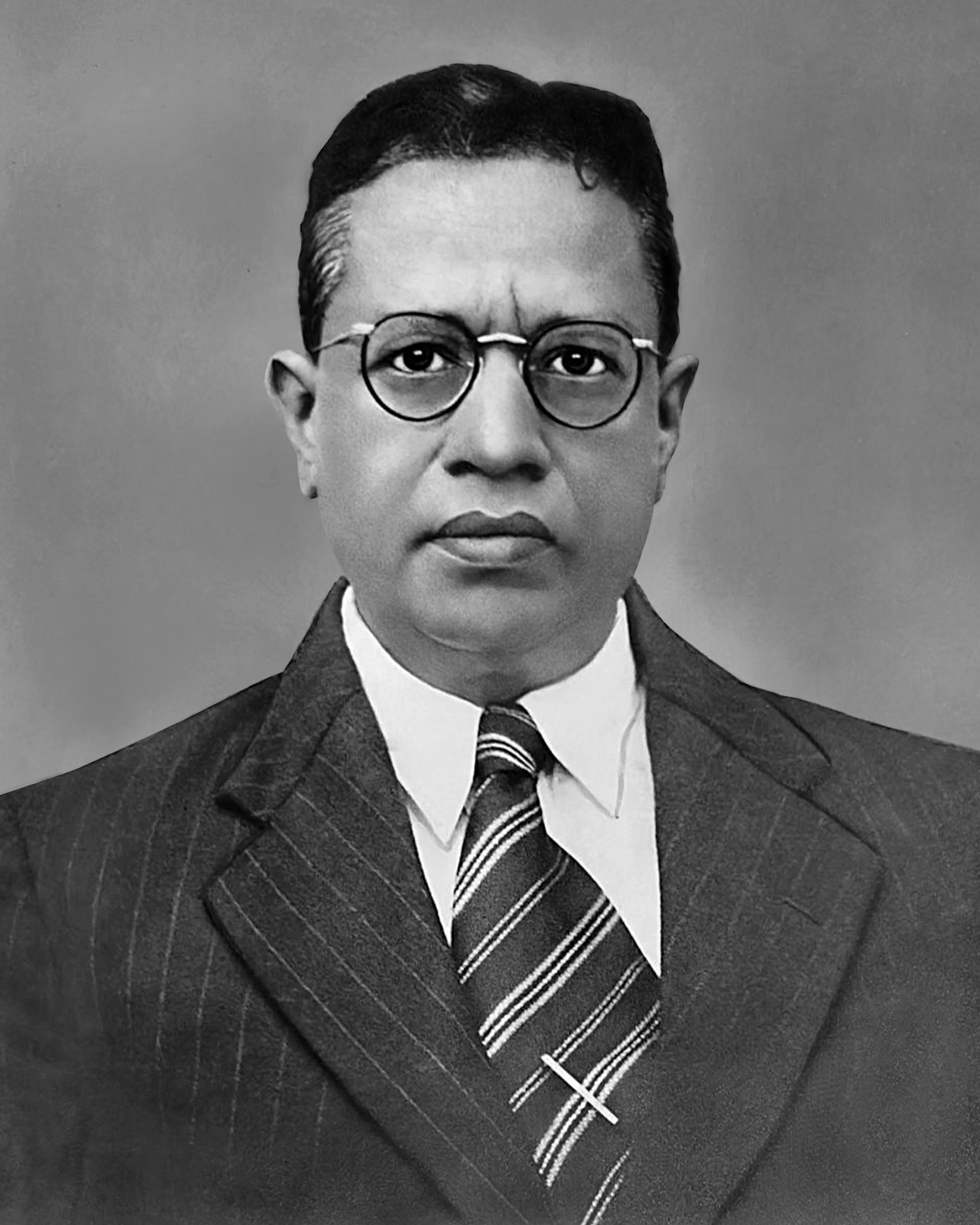
Dr. P. Krishnamurthi

Panchapakesa Krishnamurti (also spelt as Krishnamoorthy / Krishnamurthy), (22 January 1903 – 14 March 1966) was a scientist and industrialist in India. He was a close associate of the Nobel laureate, Sir C.V. Raman. In 1929, Dr. Krishnamurti co-authored a paper along with Sir C.V. Raman titled, 'A New X-ray Effect', published in the Nature magazine.

In 1930, Sir C.V. Raman referred to the immense contributions made by Dr. Krishnamurti in his Nobel prize acceptance lecture:

"I should also like to draw attention to the work of Krishnamurti, who has traced a remarkable dependence of the intensity of the spectral lines observed in scattering on the nature of the chemical bond, and followed the transition from the homopolar to the heteropolar type of chemical combination. Krishnamurti’s observation that the paramagnetism of crystals apparently influences the observed intensity of the displaced lines is one of the most remarkable ever made in this new field of research."

Dr. Krishnamurti and Sir C.V. Raman started a company called Travancore Chemical & Manufacturing (now TCM Ltd.) in 1943, with Sir C.V. Raman as the Chairman and Dr. Krishnamurti as the Managing Director. They established four factories across south India and the company is listed on the Bombay Stock Exchange. For over 5 decades, the company was a leader in the manufacture of copper sulphate, sodium chlorate and other chemicals.

Dr. Krishnamurthi founded Titan Paints and Chemicals in 1945 in the city of Coimbatore, which was later acquired by Lakshmi Machine Works (LMW). He also founded Bangalore Chemicals Manufacturing Co (BCM) which manufactured mantles, and Mysore Chemical Manufacturers Ltd (MCM).

== Works ==
Krishnamurthi is the author of two books:

- Sir C.V. Raman: A Short Biographical Sketch
- Studies in X-ray Diffraction
