= Spatially offset Raman spectroscopy =

Spatially offset Raman spectroscopy (SORS) is a variant of Raman spectroscopy that allows highly accurate chemical analysis of objects beneath obscuring surfaces, such as tissue, coatings and bottles. Examples of uses include analysis of: bone beneath skin, tablets inside plastic bottles, explosives inside containers and counterfeit tablets inside blister packs. There have also been advancements in the development of deep non-invasive medical diagnosis using SORS with the hopes of being able to detect breast tumors.

Intensity distribution of the diffused light when one select only the part coming out in reflection at a distance from the source.

Raman spectroscopy relies on inelastic scattering events of monochromatic light to produce a spectrum characteristic of a sample. The technique usually uses the red-shifted photons produced by monochromatic light losing energy to a vibrational motion within a molecule. The shift in colour and the probability of inelastic scatter is characteristic of the molecule that scatters the photon. A molecule may produce over 10 to 20 major lines, though this is restricted only by the number of bonds and symmetry constraints. Importantly, the spectrum produced by a mixture forms a linear combination of the component spectra, enabling relative chemical content to be determined in a simple spectroscopic measurement using chemometric analysis.

== Methods ==
Conventional Raman spectroscopy is limited to the near-surface of diffusely scattering objects. For example, with tissue it is limited to the first few hundred micrometres depth of surface material. Raman spectroscopy is used for this purpose in many applications where its high chemical specificity enables chemical mapping of surfaces, e.g., tablet mapping. Measurement beyond the surface of diffusely scattering samples is limited because the signal intensity is high in the region of laser excitation and that dominates the collected signal.

The basic SORS technique was invented and developed by Pavel Matousek, Anthony Parker and collaborators at the Rutherford Appleton Laboratory in the UK. The method relies upon the fact that most materials are neither completely transparent to light nor completely block it, but that they tend to scatter the light. An example is when a red laser pointer illuminates the end of a finger - the light scatters throughout all of the tissue in the finger. Wherever the light goes there will be some inelastic scattering due to the Raman effect, so, at some point, most parts of an object will generate a detectable Raman signal, even if it is not at the surface. The trick with SORS is to make a measurement that avoids the dominating excitation region.

A SORS measurement will make at least two Raman measurements; one at the source and one at an offset position of typically a few millimetres away. The two spectra can be subtracted using a scaled subtraction to produce two spectra representing the subsurface and surface spectra. For a simple two-layer system, such as powder in a plastic bottle, the powder spectrum can be measured without knowing the bottle material or its relative signal contribution. To do this without using an offset measurement would be severely restricted by photon shot noise generated by Raman and fluorescence signals originating from the surface layer.

Scaled subtraction works well for two-layer systems but more complicated examples, such as where the overlying material contains components included in the sub-layer (living tissue, for example), may require multi-variate analysis. When multi-variate techniques, such as principal component analysis are used, it is necessary to take several spectra at varied offset distances. As the spatial offset increases the ratio of the spectral contribution sub-surface/surface increases. However, the total signal also decreases with increasing offset, so the ratio cannot increase forever in a practical measurement.

Inverse SORS is a useful sub-variant of SORS that improves certain measurements such as analysis of tissue in vivo. Rather than use a spot collection geometry and a circular spot for illumination the constant offset can be maintained by illuminating the sample with a ring of light centred on the collection region. This has several advantages, including lowering the total power density and allowing simple manipulation of offset distance.

Micro-spatially offset Raman spectroscopy (micro-SORS) combines SORS with microscopy. The main difference between SORS and micro-SORS is the spatial resolution: while SORS is suited to the analysis of millimetric layers, micro-SORS is able to resolve thin, micrometric-scale layers.
