= Riffle splitter =

The riffle splitter is a device used to divide a bulk sample of material into smaller, representative sub-samples. It can be used in laboratory settings or fieldwork.

The device is usually constructed with steel sheet and should be designed to have an even number of opposing inclined chutes (the riffles), with each chute having the same width. The recommended chute width should be at least 2.5× the size of the maximum particle diameter that can be found in the lot to be split. Riffle splitters are typically used in assay and analytical laboratories to reduce the size of samples provided from other sources (crushed rock, soils, powders and so on) to a lot size that is appropriate for the next stage of analytical sample preparation.

== Design ==
There are many different versions of the riffle splitter. However, not all can be considered correct sub-sampling devices, in that the two sub-sample halves are deemed to be representative of the original lot. The issue of correctness of a riffles split sub-sample are function of both the design and the use of the splitter.

The design key items are:

- The splitter should have an even number of riffles so the two sub sample have the same mass
- The chute widths should be 2.5× the maximum particle size so as to preclude blocking of the chutes by groups larger fragments in the lot. Typically this maximum particle size is in the order of 15 mm for most commercially available riffle splitters
- The chutes should have relatively sharp edges so a fragment falling onto a chute edge is directed into an adjacent chute and does not bounce away into a non-edge-adjacent chute
- The feeder to the chute (either a pan or dump-box) should have the same width as the set of riffles
- The design of tiered riffle splitters (splitters stacked in tiers above one another) is often incorrect as the outflow from an upper tier does not usually fall vertically in the centre of the next tier (see correct use below)

== Use ==
Incorrect use of a riffle splitter will lead to sample biases, with the subs lot potentially having unacceptably higher or lower concentrations of the lot analytes or attributes being measured. The main operational factors are as follows:

- The splitter should be operated in an environment where any dust generated is captured in an appropriate manner that does not endanger the health and safety of the operator, with operators using appropriate dust masks when splitting potential hazardous materials, such a rock silica dust.
- The primary lot being split must by dry and free-flowing.
- The splitter should be fed by a pan, bucket or hopper that is the same width as the set of riffles in the device.
- Before splitting the material in the feed, the device should be leveled such that approximately the same volume of material will pass through each riffle. Dumping material from bags, buckets or shovels is incorrect and may lead to unacceptable sub sampling biases.
- The material from the primary lot should be fed slowly to the centre of the device so as to fall vertically under gravity through the splitter. Feeding the material to one side of the device usually results in flooding of the riffles with the excess material flowing (often the fine fraction) into an adjacent riffle (see Gy, 1982 p. 295).
- A good practice is to alternate between the two sub lots from sample to sample when selecting the sub lot that is to be subject to analysis or further splitting or other sample preparation, so as to mitigate any potential bias that may occur by always selecting the sub lot from the same side of the splitter.
- Importantly, the splitter needs to be cleaned after each use using a brush and or compressed air streams to blow away any retained dust.

== Use in mineral exploration ==
In many real-world situations outside the laboratory obeying the correct use advice above is not always possible. In particular tiered riffle splitters are widely used in the mineral industry for sub sampling drill hole cuttings at the drilling site. These devices are problematic in that they are usually fed rapidly, the dump-devices are not well designed to allow the material to flow evenly and freely, and the volume of material and sometimes moist state, often results, in choking of the splitter, overflows and sample losses. The best approach is usually to slow the rate of drilling, split the primary lot after drilling as a separate exercise (not part of the drilling routine) and only split samples that are dry and free flowing (all other need be dried and crushed). Importantly replicates samples from the splitter rejects need to be collected regularly to monitor the potential splitter bias that may occur when the analytical sub sample is always collected from the same side of the splitting device.

== See also ==
- Sampling (statistics)
- Gy's sampling theory
