= Journal of Chemical Sciences =

- Discipline: Chemistry
- Language: English
- Edited by: S. Natarajan

Publication details
- Former names: Proceedings of the Indian Academy of Sciences, Part A
- History: 1978–present
- Publisher: Springer Science+Business Media on behalf of the Indian Academy of Sciences (India)
- Frequency: 2020: One volume per year 2015–2019: 12 issues per year 1978–2014: 6 issues per year
- Impact factor: 1.573 (2020)

Standard abbreviations
- ISO 4: J. Chem. Sci.

Indexing
- CODEN: JCSBB5
- ISSN: 0974-3626 (print); 0973-7103 (web)
- LCCN: 2004325296
- OCLC no.: 54675731

Links
- Journal homepage; Online archive

The Journal of Chemical Sciences is a monthly peer-reviewed scientific journal that publishes original research articles, rapid communications, reviews and perspective articles, covering many areas of Chemical Sciences. It also publishes special issues on frontier areas of the subject. It is published by the Indian Academy of Sciences and co-published by Springer. The editor-in-chief is S. Natarajan (Indian Institute of Science, Bengaluru).

== History ==
Originally a part of the Proceedings of the Indian Academy of Sciences – Section A, started in 1934, the journal evolved into an independent journal titled Proceedings – Chemical Sciences in 1978. It was retitled Journal of Chemical Sciences in 2004.

== Abstracting and indexing ==
The journal is abstracted and indexed in:

- Science Citation Index
- Scopus
- Inspec
- EMBASE
- Chemical Abstracts Service
- EBSCO databases
- CAB International
- Abstracts in Anthropology
- Academic OneFile
- Academic Search
- CAB Abstracts
- ChemWeb
- CSA Environmental Sciences & Pollution Management Database
- Current Contents/Physical, Chemical and Earth Sciences
- EI-Compendex
- Elsevier BIOBASE
- GEOBASE
- INIS Atomindex

According to the Journal Citation Reports, the journal has a 2020 impact factor of 1.573.
