= Journal of Raman Spectroscopy =

- Discipline: Spectroscopy
- Language: English
- Edited by: Laurence A. Nafie

Publication details
- History: 1973–present
- Publisher: John Wiley & Sons
- Frequency: Monthly
- Impact factor: 2.2 (2025)

Standard abbreviations
- ISO 4: J. Raman Spectrosc.

Indexing
- CODEN: JRSPAF
- ISSN: 0377-0486 (print); 1097-4555 (web)

Links
- Journal homepage; Online access; Online archive

The Journal of Raman Spectroscopy is a monthly peer-reviewed scientific journal covering all aspects of Raman spectroscopy, including Higher Order Processes, and Brillouin and Rayleigh scattering. It was established in 1973 and is published by John Wiley & Sons. The editor-in-chief is Laurence A. Nafie (Syracuse University).

== Abstracting and indexing ==
The journal is abstracted and indexed in:

- Advanced Polymers Abstracts
- Cambridge Scientific Abstracts
- Ceramic Abstracts/World Ceramics Abstracts
- Chemical Abstracts Service
- Chemistry Citation Index
- ChemWeb
- Civil Engineering Abstracts
- Computer & Information Systems Abstracts
- Computer Information & Technology Abstracts
- Current Contents/Physical, Chemical & Earth Sciences
- Engineered Materials Abstracts
- Inspec
- International Aerospace Abstracts & Database
- Materials Business File
- Materials Information
- Mechanical & Transportation Engineering Abstracts
- METADEX
- Earthquake Engineering Abstracts
- Science Citation Index
- Scopus
- Technology Research Database

According to the Journal Citation Reports, the journal has a 2025 impact factor of 2.2.

== Notable papers ==
As of 2012, the most cited papers published by the journal are:

- Rousseau, D. L.; Bauman, R. P.; Porto, S. P. S. (1980). "Normal mode determination in crystals". Journal of Raman Spectroscopy. 10 (1): 253–290. doi:10.1002/jrs.1250100152.
- de Faria, D. L. A.; Venâncio Silva, S.; de Oliveira, M. T. (November 1997). "Raman microspectroscopy of some iron oxides and oxyhydroxides". Journal of Raman Spectroscopy. 28 (11): 873–878. doi:10.1002/(SICI)1097-4555(199711)28:11<873::AID-JRS177>3.0.CO;2-B.
- Ohsaka, Toshiaki; Izumi, Fujio; Fujiki, Yoshinori (December 1978). "Raman spectrum of anatase, TiO_{2}". Journal of Raman Spectroscopy. 7 (6): 321–324. doi:10.1002/jrs.1250070606.
