= Magicraft =

2024 video game

- Developer: Wave Game
- Publisher: Bilibili
- Engine: Unity
- Platform: Windows
- Release: WW: November 1, 2024
- Genres: Action, Roguelike
- Mode: Single-player

Magicraft is an action roguelike video game developed by Wave Game and published by Bilibili. Released in November 2024, the game combines spell-crafting mechanics and procedurally generated levels that has drawn comparisons to titles like Noita, Hades, and The Binding of Isaac.

== Gameplay ==
Magicraft features twin-stick shooter combat with a focus on modular spell creation. Players combine:

- Spells: Over 100 base abilities including projectiles, laser beams, and summoning magic
- Wands: Customizable weapons with unique mana pools and slot configurations
- Relics: 80+ passive items that modify gameplay (e.g., automatic spellcasting, explosion modifiers)

Key systems include:

- Spell chaining where modifiers affect subsequent abilities in a wand's slot sequence
- A room-based progression system similar to Hades, offering choice between combat encounters and upgrades
- Permanent unlocks including new character skins and wand slots

== Reception ==
As of Feb 7th 2025, the game received a "Very Positive" rating on Steam based on 10,930 reviews. Critics praised the game's build diversity but noted occasional balance issues with late-game relics. The Steam Deck compatibility received particular praise for control optimization.
