= MacCullagh ellipsoid =

The MacCullagh ellipsoid is defined by the equation:

$$\frac{x^2}{A} + \frac{y^2}{B} + \frac{z^2}{C} = 2 E,$$

where $E$ is the energy and $x,y,z$ are the components of the angular momentum, given in body's principal reference frame, with corresponding principal moments of inertia $A,B,C$. The construction of such ellipsoid was conceived by James MacCullagh.

== See also ==
- Dzhanibekov effect
- Poinsot's ellipsoid
