= Petri Purho =

Finnish video game designer (born 1983)

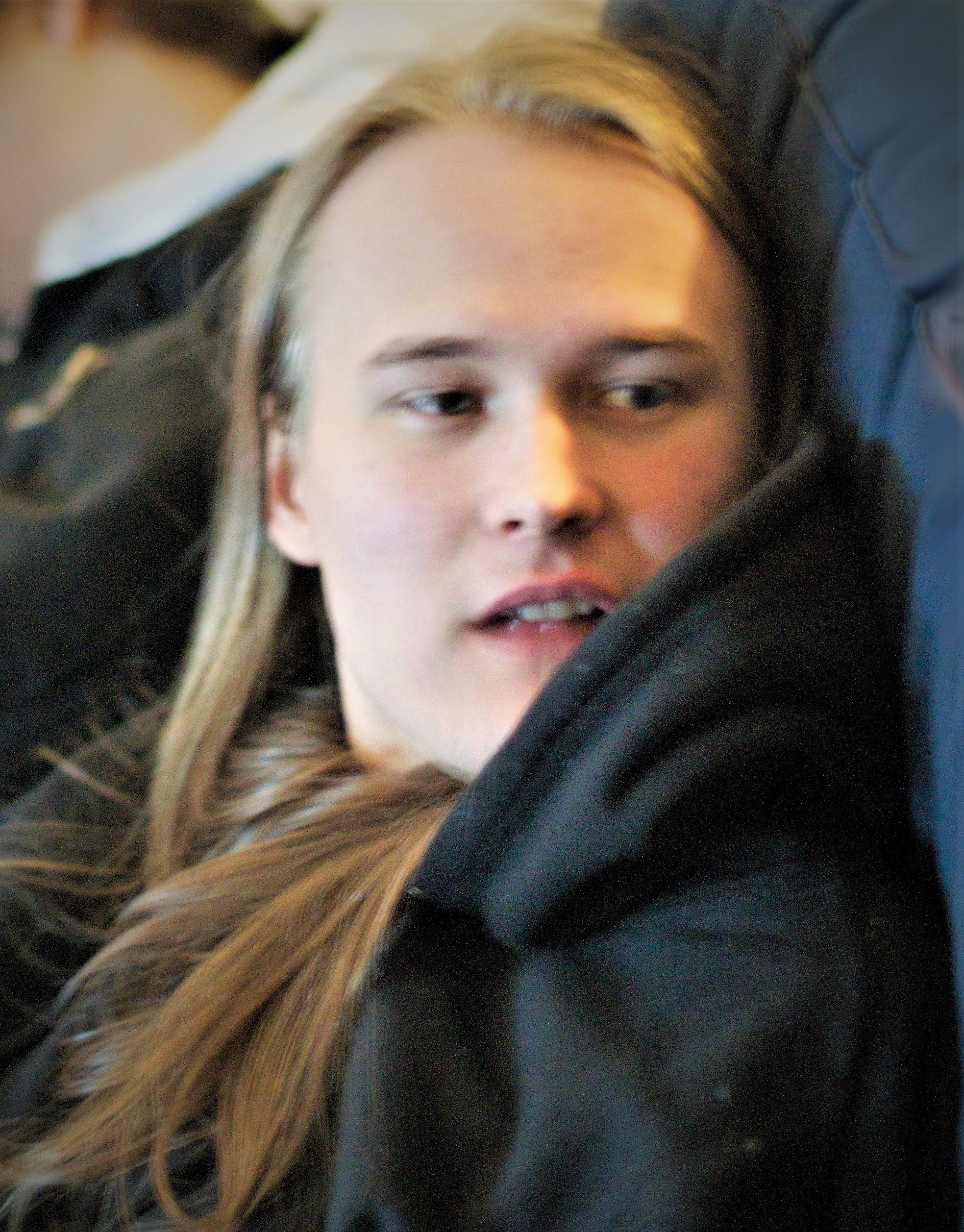
- Purho at the 2010 Game Developers Conference
- Born: 1983 (age 42–43); Kouvola, Finland

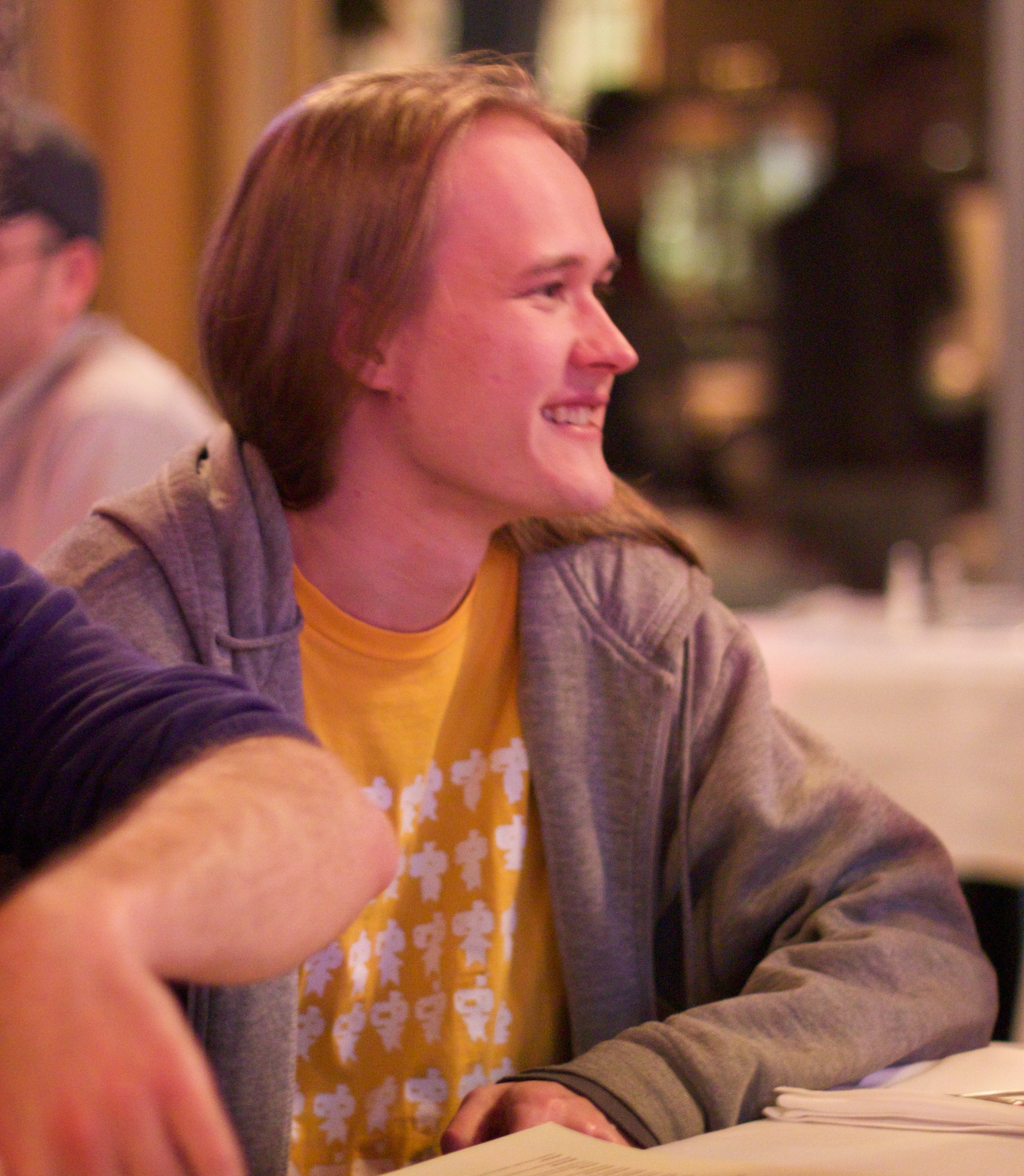
Purho at the 2010 Game Developers Conference post-awards dinner

Petri Purho (born 1983 in Kouvola, Finland) is a Finnish game developer and a cofounder of the game studio Nolla Games. He maintained an independent studio, Kloonigames, and has previously also worked at Finnish independent video game developer studio Frozenbyte. He is best-known for the roguelite Noita and the puzzler Crayon Physics Deluxe, which won the Seumas McNally Grand Prize at the Independent Games Festival in 2008.

Purho initially made a name for himself as a rapid game prototyper. Almost all of his early games were created within one week as a massive prototyping project. The most common element of these prototypes is various bonuses for successful combos and/or chain reactions. These games were mainly created using open-source technologies.

== Crayon Physics ==
Crayon Physics was Purho's tenth rapid game prototype and was coded in five days. It is a slow-paced puzzle game based on rigid bodies physics. It was publicly and commercially released under Purho's studio name of Kloonigames.

== Noita ==
Noita, a rogue-like platformer developed by Nolla games (of which Purho is a member), was released for Windows 10 on Steam, GoG, Itch and Humble on October 15, 2020. It currently sits at a 76% on Metacritic and an 8/10 on Edge.
