= Poinsot's ellipsoid =

Geometric method for visualizing a rotating rigid body

In classical mechanics, Poinsot's construction (after Louis Poinsot) is a geometrical method for visualizing the torque-free motion of a rotating rigid body, that is, the motion of a rigid body on which no external forces are acting. This motion has four constants: the kinetic energy of the body and the three components of the angular momentum, expressed with respect to an inertial laboratory frame. The angular velocity vector $\boldsymbol\omega$ of the rigid rotor is not constant, but satisfies Euler's equations. The conservation of kinetic energy and angular momentum provide two constraints on the motion of $\boldsymbol\omega$.

Without explicitly solving these equations, the motion $\boldsymbol\omega$ can be described geometrically as follows:

- The rigid body's motion is entirely determined by the motion of its inertia ellipsoid, which is rigidly fixed to the rigid body like a coordinate frame.
- Its inertia ellipsoid rolls, without slipping, on the invariable plane, with the center of the ellipsoid a constant height above the plane.
- At all times, $\boldsymbol\omega$ is the point of contact between the ellipsoid and the plane.

The motion is quasiperiodic. $\boldsymbol\omega$ traces out a closed curve on the ellipsoid, but a curve on the plane that is not necessarily a closed curve.

- The closed curve on the ellipsoid is the polhode.
- The curve on the plane is the herpolhode.

If the rigid body has two equal moments of inertia (a case called a symmetric top), the line segment from the origin to $\boldsymbol\omega$ sweeps out a cone (and its endpoint a circle). This is the torque-free precession of the rotation axis of the rotor.

== Angular kinetic energy constraint ==
The law of conservation of energy implies that in the absence of energy dissipation or applied torques, the angular kinetic energy $T\$ is conserved, so $\frac{dT}{dt} = 0$.

The angular kinetic energy may be expressed in terms of the moment of inertia tensor $\mathbf{I}$ and the angular velocity vector $\boldsymbol\omega$

$$T =
\frac{1}{2} {\boldsymbol\omega}^{T} \cdot \mathbf{I} \cdot \boldsymbol\omega =
\frac{1}{2} I_{1} \omega_{1}^{2} + \frac{1}{2} I_{2} \omega_{2}^{2} + \frac{1}{2} I_{3} \omega_{3}^{2}$$

where $\omega_{k}\$ are the components of the angular velocity vector $\boldsymbol\omega$, and the $I_{k}\$ are the principal moments of inertia when both are in the body frame. Thus, the conservation of kinetic energy imposes a constraint on the three-dimensional angular velocity vector $\boldsymbol\omega$; in the principal axis frame, it must lie on the ellipsoid defined by the above equation, called the inertia ellipsoid.

The path traced out on this ellipsoid by the angular velocity vector $\boldsymbol\omega$ is called the polhode (coined by Poinsot from Greek roots for "pole path") and is generally circular or taco-shaped.

== Angular momentum constraint ==
The law of conservation of angular momentum states that in the absence of applied torques, the angular momentum vector $\mathbf{L}$ is conserved in an inertial reference frame, so $\frac{d \mathbf{L}}{dt} = 0$.

The angular momentum vector $\mathbf{L}$ can be expressed in terms of the moment of inertia tensor $\mathbf{I}$ and the angular velocity vector $\boldsymbol\omega$

$$\mathbf{L} = \mathbf{I} \cdot \boldsymbol\omega$$

which leads to the equation

$$T = \frac{1}{2} {\boldsymbol\omega}^{T} \cdot \mathbf{L}.$$

Since the dot product of $\boldsymbol\omega$ and $\mathbf{L}$ is constant, and $\mathbf{L}$ itself is constant, the angular velocity vector $\boldsymbol\omega$ has a constant component in the direction of the angular momentum vector $\mathbf{L}$. This imposes a second constraint on the vector $\boldsymbol\omega$; in absolute space, it must lie on the invariable plane defined by its dot product with the conserved vector $\mathbf{L}$. The normal vector to the invariable plane is aligned with $\mathbf{L}$. The path traced out by the angular velocity vector $\boldsymbol\omega$ on the invariable plane is called the herpolhode (coined from Greek roots for "serpentine pole path").

The herpolhode is generally an open curve, which means that the rotation does not perfectly repeat, but the polhode is a closed curve (see below).

== Tangency condition and construction ==
These two constraints operate in different reference frames; the ellipsoidal constraint holds in the (rotating) principal axis frame, whereas the invariable plane constant operates in absolute space. To relate these constraints, we note that the gradient vector of the kinetic energy with respect to angular velocity vector $\boldsymbol\omega$ equals the angular momentum vector $\mathbf{L}$

$$\frac{dT}{d\boldsymbol\omega} = \mathbf{I} \cdot \boldsymbol\omega = \mathbf{L}.$$

Hence, the normal vector to the kinetic-energy ellipsoid at $\boldsymbol\omega$ is proportional to $\mathbf{L}$, which is also true of the invariable plane. Since their normal vectors point in the same direction, these two surfaces will intersect tangentially.

Taken together, these results show that, in an absolute reference frame, the instantaneous angular velocity vector $\boldsymbol\omega$ is the point of intersection between a fixed invariable plane and a kinetic-energy ellipsoid that is tangent to it and rolls around on it without slipping. This is Poinsot's construction. (Note that the condition of no slippage does not exclude the possibility of rotation on the point of contact. In particular, if the body is rotating around one of its principal axes, the ellipsoid simply rotates on a single point of the invariant plane.)

== Derivation of the polhodes in the body frame ==
In the principal axis frame (which is rotating in absolute space), the direction of the angular momentum vector is generally not constant, even in the absence of applied torques, but varies as described by Euler's equations. However, in the absence of applied torques, the magnitude $L\$of the angular momentum and the kinetic energy $T\$are both conserved

$$\begin{align}
L^{2} &= L_{1}^{2} + L_{2}^{2} + L_{3}^{2} \\[2pt]
T &= \frac{L_{1}^{2}}{2I_{1}} + \frac{L_{2}^{2}}{2I_{2}} + \frac{L_{3}^{2}}{2I_{3}}
\end{align}$$

where the $L_{k}\$are the components of the angular momentum vector along the principal axes, and the $I_{k}\$are the principal moments of inertia.

These conservation laws are equivalent to two constraints to the three-dimensional angular momentum vector $\mathbf{L}$. The kinetic energy constrains $\mathbf{L}$ to lie on an ellipsoid in the space ($L_{1}, L_{2}, L_{3}$), whereas the angular momentum constraint constrains $\mathbf{L}$ to lie on a sphere in this space. (In the space ($\omega_{1}, \omega_{2}, \omega_{3}$) used before, the kinetic energy ellipsoid has the "opposite" shape – longest in the direction of the axis with lowest moment of inertia and narrowest in the direction of the axis with highest moment of inertia.) These two surfaces intersect in two curves shaped like the edge of a taco that define the possible solutions for $\mathbf{L}$. This shows that $\mathbf{L}$, and the polhode, stay on a closed loop, in the object's moving frame of reference.

The orientation of the body in space thus has two degrees of freedom. Firstly, some point on the "taco edge" has to align with $\mathbf L,$ which is a constant vector in absolute space. Secondly, the body can have any amount of rotation around that vector. So in general, the body's orientation is some point on a toroidal 2-manifold inside the 3-manifold of all orientations. In general, the object will follow a non-periodic path on this torus, but it may follow a periodic path. The time taken for $\mathbf L$ to complete one cycle around its track in the body frame is constant, but after a cycle the body will have rotated by an amount that may not be a rational number of degrees, in which case the orientation will not be periodic, but quasiperiodic.

In general the torus is almost determined by three parameters: the ratios of the second and third moments of inertia to the highest of the three moments of inertia, and the ratio $L^2/(TI_3)$ relating the angular momentum to the energy times the highest moment of inertia. But for any such a set of parameters there are two tori, because there are two "tacos" (corresponding to two polhodes). A set of 180° rotations carries any orientation of one torus into an orientation of the other with the opposite point aligned with the angular momentum vector. If the angular momentum is exactly aligned with a principal axes, the torus degenerates into a single loop. If exactly two moments of inertia are equal (a so-called symmetric top), then in addition to tori there will be an infinite number of loops, and if all three moments of inertia are equal, there will be loops but no tori. If the three moments of inertia are all different and $L^2=TI_2$ but the intermediate axis is not aligned with the angular momentum, then the podhode will be a curbe going from one end of the intermediate axis to the other, and $\mathbf{L}$ will travel asymptotically towards one end. Putting it another way, it stays on one half of one or the tori.

Because of all this, when the three moments of inertia are different and the angular velocity vector (or the angular momentum vector) is not close to the axis of highest or lowest inertia, the body "tumbles". Most moons rotate more or less around their axis of greatest inertia (due to viscous effects), but Hyperion (a moon of Saturn), two moons of Pluto and many other small bodies of the Solar System have tumbling rotations.

Dzhanibekov effect demonstration in microgravity, NASA.

If the body is set spinning on its intermediate principal axis, then the intersection of the ellipsoid and the sphere is like two loops that cross at two points, lined up with that axis. If the alignment with the intermediate axis is not perfect then $\mathbf{L}$ will eventually move off this point along one of the four tracks that depart from this point, and head to the opposite point. This corresponds to $\boldsymbol\omega$ moving to its antipode on the Poinsot ellipsoid. See video at right and Tennis racket theorem.

This construction differs from Poinsot's construction because it considers the angular momentum vector $\mathbf{L}$ rather than the angular velocity vector $\boldsymbol\omega$. It appears to have been developed by Jacques Philippe Marie Binet.

== Symmetric top ==
The motion is simplified in the case of a so-called "symmetric top", which is defined as an object having two of its principal moments of inertia equal. (We are not talking about a top that spins on a surface, because gravity exerts a torque in that case.) This usually means that the object has an n-fold rotational axis of symmetry with n at least 3, or else circular symmetry. (But if it also has the elements of chiral tetrahedral symmetry, as do octahedral symmetry and dodecahedral symmetry, then all three moments of inertia will be equal and the axis of rotation will be constant.) This includes rotation of a prolate spheroid (the shape of a rugby ball), or rotation of an oblate spheroid (the shape of a flattened sphere). In this case, the angular velocity vector describes a cone, both the polhode and the herpolhode are circles (or a single point), and the orientation can be given as a closed-form function of time. (This is not the same as the axial precession of a planet, which is caused by torque exerted by the sun and, in the case of the earth, the moon. Rather, it is the "free nutation" known as the Chandler wobble.)

The motion of the body can be considered as the combination of a rotation of the main axis (the principal axis having the different moment of inertia, normally an axis of symmetry) around $\mathbf L$, called precession, and an additional rotation around the main axis, called intrinsic rotation. In intrinsic rotation, the vector $\mathbf L$ moves around the body in the body frame of reference. In general there is a third component, rotation around the line of nodes, called nutation (see Euler angles), but in the case of the symmetric top this is zero. If we designate the main axis with subscript 1 and the axes perpendicular to it with the subscript 2, then the components of $\boldsymbol\omega$ are $\omega_1$ and $\omega_2.$ The rate of intrinsic rotation is then

$$\omega_{rot}=\left(1-\frac{I_1}{I_2}\right)\omega_1$$

and the rate of precession is:

$$\omega_{pre}=\sqrt{\left(\frac{I_1}{I_2}\omega_1\right)^2+\omega_2^2}$$

The angle between the main axis and the angular momentum vector is constant, equal to:

$$\alpha=\arctan\left(\frac{I_1}{I_2}\frac{\omega_1}{\omega_2}\right)$$

If $\omega_{rot}/\omega_{pre}$ is a rational number then the motion will be periodic, otherwise quasiperiodic.

The ratio $I_1/I_2$ is in the interval (0, 2). A prolate spheroid has a value less than 1 and the rotation is in the same direction as the precession. An example would be a badly thrown football. An oblate spheroid has a value greater than 1 and the rotation is backwards and smaller compared to the precession. An example is a badly thrown discus.

We can easily express the motion of the symmetric top using quaternions (see Quaternions and spatial rotation). We take $\mathbf L$ to be pointing in the z direction. From an initial position in which the "north pole" of the main axis is tipped away from the z-axis at an angle $\alpha$ in the x direction, rotation up to time t is the composition of an intrinsic rotation $\left(\cos(\omega_{rot} t/2),\ \sin\alpha\sin(\omega_{rot} t/2),\ 0,\ \cos\alpha\sin(\omega_{rot} t/2)\right)$ and a precession $\left(\cos(\omega_{pre} t/2),\ 0,\ 0,\ \sin(\omega_{pre} t/2)\right):$

$$\Big(\cos(\omega_{pre} t/2),\ 0,\ 0,\ \sin(\omega_{pre} t/2)\Big)\Big(\cos(\omega_{rot} t/2),\ \sin\alpha\sin(\omega_{rot} t/2),\ 0,\ \cos\alpha\sin(\omega_{rot} t/2)\Big)=$$

$\Big(\cos(\omega_{pre} t/2)\cos(\omega_{rot} t/2)-\cos\alpha\sin(\omega_{pre} t/2)\sin(\omega_{rot} t/2),\$$\sin\alpha\cos(\omega_{pre} t/2)\sin(\omega_{rot} t/2),\$$\sin\alpha\sin(\omega_{pre} t/2)\sin(\omega_{rot} t/2),\$$\sin(\omega_{pre} t/2)\cos(\omega_{rot} t/2)+\cos\alpha\cos(\omega_{pre} t/2)\sin(\omega_{rot} t/2)\Big)$

If we take as a reference orientation one in which the "north pole" is pointing in the negative z direction then the orientation at time t is given by preceding the above rotation by a rotation by 180°−α from the reference orientation to the initial orientation, namely $\left(\sin(\alpha/2),\ 0,\ -\cos(\alpha/2),\ 0\right).$ Upon simplification this gives the orientation at time t as:

$\Big(\sin(\alpha/2)\cos((\omega_{pre}-\omega_{rot})t/2),\$$\cos(\alpha/2)\sin((\omega_{pre}+\omega_{rot})t/2),\$$-\cos(\alpha/2)\cos((\omega_{pre}+\omega_{rot})t/2),\$$\sin(\alpha/2)\sin((\omega_{pre}-\omega_{rot})t/2) \Big)$

Example: Let's take the (periodic) case in which $\omega_{rot}=\omega_{pre}$ and we will call this $\omega_{com}.$ (This is only possible if $I_1/I_2\le 1/2.$) In this case, the rotation up to time t is:

$$\Big(\cos^2(\omega_{com} t/2)-\cos\alpha\sin^2(\omega_{com} t/2),\ \sin\alpha\cos(\omega_{com} t/2)\sin(\omega_{com} t/2),\ \sin\alpha\sin^2(\omega_{com} t/2),\ (1+\cos\alpha)\cos(\omega_{com} t/2)\sin(\omega_{com} t/2)\Big)$$

which simplifies to:

$$\Big(\cos^2(\omega_{com} t/2)-\cos\alpha\sin^2(\omega_{com} t/2),\ \sin\alpha\sin(\omega_{com} t)/2,\ \sin\alpha\sin^2(\omega_{com} t/2),\ (1+\cos\alpha)\sin(\omega_{com} t)/2\Big)$$

With respect to the reference orientation with the "north pole" pointing in the negative z direction, the orientation at time t is given by:

$$\Big(\sin(\alpha/2),\ \cos(\alpha/2)\sin(\omega_{com} t),\ -\cos(\alpha/2)\cos(\omega_{com} t),\ 0\Big)$$

This is always a rotation of 180°−α from the reference orientation. As the body shape approaches that of a narrow rod the ratio $I_1/I_2$ approaches zero, α approaches 90°, and the orientation is always just over 90° from the reference orientation.

== Applications ==
One of the applications of Poinsot's construction is in visualizing the rotation of a spacecraft in orbit.

== See also ==
- Polhode
- Precession
- Principal axes
- Rigid body dynamics
- Moment of inertia
- Tait–Bryan rotations
- Euler angles
- MacCullagh ellipsoid
- Rattleback

== Sources ==
- Poinsot (1834) Theorie Nouvelle de la Rotation des Corps, Bachelier, Paris.
- Landau LD and Lifshitz EM (1976) Mechanics, 3rd. ed., Pergamon Press. ISBN 0-08-021022-8 (hardcover) and ISBN 0-08-029141-4 (softcover).
- Goldstein H. (1980) Classical Mechanics, 2nd. ed., Addison-Wesley. ISBN 0-201-02918-9
- Symon KR. (1971) Mechanics, 3rd. ed., Addison-Wesley. ISBN 0-201-07392-7
