= Polhode =

Curve produced by the angular velocity vector on the inertia ellipsoid

The details of a spinning body may impose restrictions on the motion of its angular velocity vector, ω. The curve produced by the angular velocity vector on the inertia ellipsoid, is known as the polhode, coined from Greek meaning "path of the pole". The surface created by the angular velocity vector is termed the body cone.

== History ==
The concept of polhode motion dates back to the 17th century, and Corollary 21 to Proposition 66 in Section 11, Book 1, of Isaac Newton's Principia Mathematica. Later Leonhard Euler derived a set of equations that described the dynamics of rigid bodies in torque-free motion. In particular, Euler and his contemporaries Jean d’Alembert, Louis Lagrange, and others noticed small variations in latitude due to wobbling of the Earth around its polar spin axis. A portion of this wobble (later to be called the Earth’s polhode motion) was due to the natural, torque-free behavior of the rotating Earth. Assuming that the Earth was a completely rigid body, they calculated the period of Earth’s polhode wobble to be about 9–10 months.

During the mid 19th century, Louis Poinsot developed a geometric interpretation of the physics of rotating bodies that provided a visual counterpart to Euler’s algebraic equations. Poinsot was a contemporary of Léon Foucault, who invented the gyroscope and whose pendulum experiments provided incontrovertible evidence that the Earth rotates. In the fashion of the day, Poinsot coined the terms polhode and its counterpart, herpolhode, to describe this wobble in the motion of rotating rigid bodies. Poinsot derived these terms from the ancient Greek πόλος pólos (pivot or end of an axis) + ὁδός hodós (path or way)—thus, polhode is the path of the pole.

Poinsot’s geometric interpretation of Earth’s polhode motion was still based on the assumption that the Earth was a completely rigid rotating body. It was not until 1891 that the American astronomer, Seth Carlo Chandler, made measurements showing that there was a periodic motion of 14 months in the Earth’s wobble and suggesting that this was the polhode motion. Initially, Chandler’s measurement, now referred to as the “Chandler wobble”, was dismissed because it was significantly greater than the long-accepted 9–10 month period calculated by Euler, Poinsot, et al. and because Chandler was unable convincingly to explain this discrepancy. However, within months, another American astronomer, Simon Newcomb, realized that Chandler was correct and provided a plausible reason for Chandler’s measurements. Newcomb realized that the Earth’s mass is partly rigid and partly elastic, and that the elastic component has no effect on the Earth’s polhode period, because the elastic part of the Earth’s mass stretches so that it is always symmetrical about the Earth’s spin axis. The rigid part of the Earth’s mass is not symmetrically distributed, and this is what causes the Chandler Wobble, or more precisely, the Earth’s polhode path.

== Description ==
Every solid body inherently has three principal axes through its center of mass, and each of these axes has a corresponding moment of inertia. The moment of inertia about an axis is a measurement of how difficult it is to accelerate the body about that axis. The closer the concentration of mass to the axis, the smaller the torque required to get it spinning at the same rate about that axis.

The moment of inertia of a body depends on the mass distribution of the body and on the arbitrarily selected axis about which the moment of inertia is defined. The moments of inertia about two of the principal axes are the maximum and minimum moments of inertia of the body about any axis. The third is perpendicular to the other two and has a moment of inertia somewhere between the maximum and minimum.

If energy is dissipated while an object is rotating, this will cause the polhode motion about the axis of maximum inertia (also called the major principal axis) to damp out or stabilize, with the polhode path becoming a smaller and smaller ellipse or circle, closing in on the axis.

A body is never stable when spinning about the intermediate principal axis, and dissipated energy will cause the polhode to start migrating to the object’s axis of maximum inertia. The transition point between two stable axes of rotation is called the separatrix along which the angular velocity passes through the axis of intermediate inertia.

Rotation about the axis of minimum inertia (also called the minor principal axis) is also stable, but given enough time, any perturbations due to energy dissipation or torques would cause the polhode path to expand, in larger and larger ellipses or circles, and eventually migrate through the separatrix and its axis of intermediate inertia to its axis of maximum inertia.

These changes in the orientation of the body as it spins may not be due to external torques, but rather result from energy dissipated internally as the body is spinning. Even if angular momentum is conserved (no external torques), internal energy can be dissipated during rotation if the body is not perfectly rigid, and any rotating body will continue to change its orientation until it has stabilized around its axis of maximum inertia, where the amount of energy corresponding to its angular momentum is least.

== See also ==
- Gravity Probe B
- Herpolhode
- Poinsot's construction
