= Noita (video game) =

2020 video game by Nolla Games

- Developer: Nolla Games
- Publisher: Nolla Games
- Programmers: Petri Purho, Olli Harjola, Arvi Teikari, Antti Tiihonen
- Composers: From Grotto and Niilo Takalainen
- Engine: Falling Everything
- Platform: Microsoft Windows
- Release: 15 October 2020
- Genres: Platform, roguelike
- Mode: Single-player

Noita is a 2020 platformer and roguelike game developed by Nolla Games. Players control a witch, called minä (lit. 'I') in the in game bestiary, that can collect and cast spells with wands in order to defeat enemies named after Finnish mythological creatures. The main game leads the player down a series of pseudorandomly generated areas ending in a boss fight, although the game contains much more secret and supplementary content. It was released in early access for Microsoft Windows on 24 September 2019, with the official 1.0 release on 15 October 2020.

== Gameplay ==
=== General ===
Gameplay screenshot.

Noita (lit. 'witch') is a single-player video game in which the player character is a witch who finds, collects, and casts spells in a procedurally generated 2D world where every pixel is physically simulated. The player fights enemies that include creatures named after Finnish mythological creatures such as Hiisi and Iku-Turso. The story opens with a cutscene that references the Karelian and Finnish national epic Kalevala. The goal in the main story of the game is to get the Sampo and use it to turn the world into gold.

The game consists of biomes, or unique areas within the game, which contain various new enemies, objects, spells, wands, and biome specific topography. The main path consists of eight biomes stacked on top of one another, descending deeper into the cave as the player progresses through the main game. These biomes are separated by "Holy Mountains", zones generally free of enemies that allow the player to edit their wands, buy new wands or spells, and select perks that change gameplay, such as giving immunity to certain types of damage, or limiting the maximum HP of the player in return for increased damage. Each successive biome generally contains stronger enemies and more valuable objects or spells than the last. In order, the biomes in the main path are: Mines, Coal Pits, Snowy Depths, Hiisi Base, Underground Jungle, The Vault, Temple of the Art, and The Laboratory. In the final biome, The Laboratory, resides the main boss of the game, Kolmisilmä (lit. 'Three-Eye'). This boss will only start attacking the player once they grab the Sampo, which can be used to either end the game or start a New Game+, depending on player actions. The Sampo's name changes based on the number of "Orbs of True Knowledge" possessed by the player, with the final name being "Amulet of Yendor", which is likely a reference to Rogue.

=== Physics ===
One of Noita's main mechanics is its physics system inspired by falling sand games (particularly the game The Powder Toy); nearly every pixel in Noita is simulated. This means that, for example, wood can burn and disappear while creating smoke pixels, which can eventually suffocate the player. Lava can be poured into water (or vice-versa) to create rock, while also evaporating some of it into steam, which eventually condenses back into water and falls down like rain. This system allows for some alchemical reactions, like making new magical liquids by combining two others, or purifying a body of dangerous liquid. Besides the simulated pixels, there are also some Box2D physics built into the world that can allow the player to throw or kick objects into enemies to deal relatively large amounts of collision damage.

=== Wand building ===
Another main mechanic of Noita is the wand and spell-casting mechanics. Wands are separate from spells as wands are containers while spells are the contents, which can be altered by the player when they are in Holy Mountains (or have the tinker with wands everywhere perk). Wands have stats including cast delay, the time between casts being performed by the wand; recharge time, which is how long before you can use the wand again after casting all spells in a wand; mana, which is a limited pool of energy that spells use; and mana recharge, how fast the mana restores itself. These stats influence the way the spells are cast. Spells can be projectiles, projectile modifiers, multicasts and more. For example, a "Spark Bolt" is a simple fast projectile, while a "Double spell" casts the two spells after it in the wand and "Ping-pong path" will make a spell last longer and fly in a back and forth trajectory. These spells also include "Chainsaw", which allows the wands to have very fast spell casting by removing its cast delay entirely, although it is classed as a projectile spell. Modifiers alter projectiles in various ways such as speed, trajectory, damage, and sometimes the aforementioned mana recharge, cast delay and recharge time. There are also miscellaneous spells such as "Torch" and "Energy shield" that do not affect the other spells in the wand, but do other things like for example putting a shield around the player or making the end of your wand flame. This system can be very complex with many unexpected synergies and interactions allows the player great creativity once they have a deep understanding of it.

=== Difficulty ===
Noita has permadeath (though some things can be unlocked permanently), and is known for its particularly difficult gameplay, such as enemies that can easily kill the player in a single hit even in the early game; causing the players to coin the term "Noita'd" for deaths that players consider to be especially unfair or unpredictable. Many spells the player can use are also actively harmful to the player: for example, Giga Disc Projectile and Omega Disc Projectile are not only larger versions of the already dangerous Disc Projectile spell, but under default behaviour both will accelerate in the opposite direction they were fired (which is usually toward the player who cast them) and can even dig through terrain, often killing the player if they are not dodged.

=== Secrets ===
Noita also consists of many other various bosses, mini-bosses, secret biomes, in-game achievements, challenges, and endings that are either hidden or not a direct part of the main game and its progression. It has many secrets and puzzles; some of them being relatively simple puzzles that the player can figure out by themselves, while others require the entire community to solve them together; some of the latter, like the Eye Messages, remain unsolved to this day. These messages, along with the also unsolved Cauldron Room, are coded in such a way that they do not appear when using mods and are generated by the game engine itself rather than loaded from the game files.

Noita's most difficult ending, where a player is required to collect 34 orbs before finishing the game, is currently considered to be impossible without the use of cheats or external tools. While technically possible, only 33 orbs are regularly allowed to be collected; the 34th orb has only a ^{1}/_{100,000,000} chance to drop from a Greater Treasure Chest, a type of chest that already only has a ^{1}/_{1,000} chance to spawn in place of a regular Treasure Chest. Despite these impossible odds, this does unlock the Celestial Ruby, one of only three unlockable cosmetic items in the game. Players are unsure to this day if the Celestial Ruby was ever meant to be found by players, or whether a method of unlocking it exists that doesn't rely on mods, external tools, or functionally impossible odds.

Some of Noita's secrets may misdirect (or even troll) those who are looking for their solutions; for example, data miners found that the aforementioned "34 orb ending" loads a QR code into memory that leads to a Rick Roll. Noise in this QR code was embedded to make players think that the true message was encoded within this noise, however when decoded this led to the exact same QR code. Another cypher in the game that was added in the Epilogue 2 Update was decoded to form the message "seeking truth, the wise find instead its profound absence".

=== Modding ===
Noita allows for modding; some of these alter regular gameplay (like adding new spells,) while others are separate modes entirely. Some mods are built-in, like the Nightmare Mode that unlocks once the player beats the game, and a Twitch integration feature that lets livestream viewers vote about in-game events.

== Development ==
Noita was developed by Nolla Games, an independent game studio based in Helsinki, Finland. The studio was formed by Petri Purho (the developer of Crayon Physics Deluxe), Olli Harjola (The Swapper) and Arvi Teikari (Baba Is You). Noita is inspired by the 1998 artillery game Liero, falling-sand games, and modern roguelikes. The game's sound design was by Niilo Takalainen, and the soundtrack was a collaboration between the Finnish psychedelic band From Grotto and Niilo Takalainen. The game went through many different design directions for two years, before settling on the final format. Petri Purho described it as "based on a falling sand style simulation. Essentially, it's complex cellular automata."

Noita was released in early access for Microsoft Windows on 24 September 2019 and is digitally distributed on GOG.com, Humble Bundle, Itch.io, and Steam. The developer expected the game to be in early access for a year before its full release. Noita left early access as the 1.0 version on 15 October 2020.

The game received post release content updates until 30 March 2021 with the release of the “Epilogue Update”, however the developers stated they would still release bug fix patches. They also highlighted the game's modding community. On 8 April 2024, the developers released a follow-up "Epilogue 2 Update" with additional content and quality of life changes.

== Reception ==
Reception

Aggregate scores
| Aggregator | Score |
|---|---|
| Metacritic | 76/100 |
| OpenCritic | 74% recommend |

Review scores
| Publication | Score |
|---|---|
| Edge | 8/10 |
| GameSpot | 7/10 |
| PC Gamer (US) | 81/100 |

Noita received generally favorable reviews from critics, according to the review aggregation website Metacritic. Fellow review aggregator OpenCritic assessed that the game received strong approval, being recommended by 74% of critics.

Noita was a finalist nominee in three categories at the 2019 Independent Games Festival: Seumas McNally Grand Prize, Excellence in Design, and Nuovo Award. Finnish computing website Muropaketti gave the early access version of Noita a 4 out of 5, and described the game as "unbridled and addictive" and that it "sets high expectations for the finished game". During the 24th Annual D.I.C.E. Awards, the Academy of Interactive Arts & Sciences nominated Noita for "Outstanding Achievement for an Independent Game". The game was nominated for "Best Technology" at the 20th Game Developers Choice Awards, held in March 2020 and for "Most Innovative Gameplay" in the Steam Awards (2020). Noita won 2 awards in the Finnish Game Awards 2021, for Finnish Game of the Year and Big Screen Game of the Year.

The Finnish Museum of Games hosted an exhibition about the game from 4 September until 12 December 2021.
