= Falling-sand game =

Video game genre

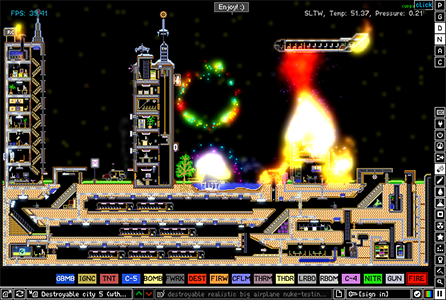
A user-created sandbox in the video game The Powder Toy

A falling-sand game is a genre of video game and a sub-genre of sandbox games that typically use a two-dimensional particle or cellular automaton based game engine to simulate various materials interacting in a sandbox environment.

In falling-sand games, the user can interact with (e.g. place and remove) particles on a canvas which can interact with other particles in various ways, which can lead to complex emergent behaviour. As sandbox games, they generally have an emphasis on free-form gameplay, relaxed rules, and minimal goals.

Despite the name, falling-sand games typically contain a multitude of materials besides sand, often called "elements".

== History ==
The first known popular example in the "falling-sand" genre was a web-based Java applet on the Japanese Dofi-Blog in 2005 which was later expanded and rehosted as the "Falling sand game", which kick-started the genre as a trend and gave it its name.

The genre is not limited to free play canvas-style games; games such as the Powder Game contain additional mechanics, such as pressure based fluid simulation allowing for example water equalisation, and RPG elements such as controllable characters.

Noita blends the traditional sandbox physics with Roguelike RPG mechanics, with playable characters and enemies.

== List of falling-sand games ==
| Title | Year | Platform | Details |
|---|---|---|---|
| Down fall | 1993 | Atari ST | 2 player falling snow |
| Falling sand game | 2005 | Java | Also called "Hell of Sand" or "World of sand" |
| wxSand | 2006 | Windows | The first standalone version |
| Powder Game | 2007 | Java, HTML5, Android, iOS | Multi-platform with liquid simulation |
| This is Sand | 2008 | Flash | Added changing the colour of the sand |
| The Powder Toy | 2010 | Windows, Linux, OS X, Android | Has liquid simulation and Newtonian gravity |
| The Sandbox | 2012 | Flash, Windows, Android, iOS | A series of games, including some 3D versions |
| sand:box | 2015 | Android, iOS, Linux, Windows | Falling sand game with advanced digital circuit simulation. |
| Noita | 2020 | Windows | A hybrid of "falling sand" style game with a Roguelike |
