= Herpolhode =

Curve traced out by the endpoint of the angular velocity vector of a rigid rotor

A herpolhode is the curve traced out by the endpoint of the angular velocity vector ω of a rigid rotor, a rotating rigid body. The endpoint of the angular velocity moves in a plane in absolute space, called the invariable plane, that is orthogonal to the angular momentum vector L. The fact that the herpolhode is a curve in the invariable plane appears as part of Poinsot's construction.

The trajectory of the angular velocity around the angular momentum in the invariable plane is a circle in the case of a symmetric top, but in the general case wiggles inside an annulus, while still being concave towards the angular momentum.

== See also ==
- Poinsot's construction
- Polhode
