= The Powder Toy =

Falling-sand game

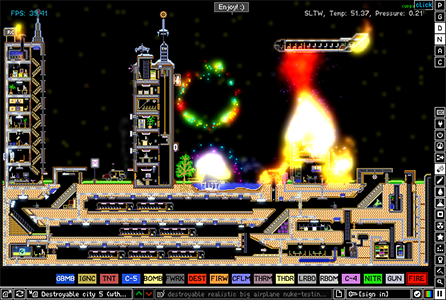
- A user interacting with community-produced content
- Original author: Stanislaw K. Skowronek
- Developers: jacob1, Simon, LBPHacker and various other GitHub contributors
- Release: 2008 (Note: Splash screen in the binary releases available on the original Powder Toy website has the following copyright notice: "(c) 2008-9 Stanislaw K Skowronek")
- Stable release: 100.1 / 8 August 2026; 3 months ago
- Platform: Windows, macOS, Linux, Android
- Type: Single-player falling-sand game
- License: GPLv3
- Website: powdertoy.co.uk
- Repository: github.com/The-Powder-Toy/The-Powder-Toy

The Powder Toy is a falling-sand game originally created by Stanislaw K. Skowronek (also known as Skylark). It is now developed and maintained by LBPHacker, Simon, jacob1 and other contributors on GitHub. The Powder Toy is free and open-source software (FOSS) licensed under the GNU General Public License version 3.0. A total of 258 (as of February 2025) different in-game materials (or "elements"), each with custom behavior and interactions, are available in the game. In June 2024, The Powder Toy was released on Steam, garnering an "Overwhelmingly Positive" review score.

== Gameplay ==
The Powder Toy is a sandbox video game programmed primarily in C++ that allows users to create content in-game to share using its online level sharing system, although posting such content is optional. The game offers a wide variety of element types and tools for its players to use, such as electricity-related elements, radioactive elements, explosives, liquids, powders and various other 'tools' that can alter the properties of other elements.

A public server for sharing in-game creations is provided as part of the game itself. Examples of player shared creations include functioning circulatory systems, nuclear power plants, nuclear bombs, and computers. Content is rated using upvotes and downvotes, and can be reported to the moderators if it breaks on-site/in-game rules.

== Modding ==
The Powder Toy allows users to add plugins and mods to the game with Lua scripting and edit the mainly C++ code base. The source code is available on GitHub and can be compiled using Meson.

A mod manager can be installed using the built-in console using the tpt.installScriptManager() command.

Users have created many forks and mods for the game.

== April Fools updates ==
The Powder Toy features annual April fools updates, most notably the 3D Mode update, alongside the addition of a fake currency called Powdercoins. April Fools updates are usually removed shortly following April Fools.

== Reception ==
edgalaxy.com called The Powder Toy a "great science game" for its potential use as a learning aid through its accurate portrayal of physics, chemical reactions and more.
