= List of moments of inertia =

Moment of inertia of diff geometric shapes

The moment of inertia, denoted by I, measures the extent to which an object resists rotational acceleration about a particular axis; it is the rotational analogue to mass (which determines an object's resistance to linear acceleration). The moments of inertia of a mass have units of dimension ML^{2} ([mass] × [length]^{2}). It should not be confused with the second moment of area, which has units of dimension L^{4} ([length]^{4}) and is used in beam calculations. The mass moment of inertia is often also known as the rotational inertia or sometimes as the angular mass.

For simple objects with geometric symmetry, one can often determine the moment of inertia in an exact closed-form expression. Typically this occurs when the mass density is constant, but in some cases, the density can vary throughout the object as well. In general, it may not be straightforward to symbolically express the moment of inertia of shapes with more complicated mass distributions and lacking symmetry. In calculating moments of inertia, it is useful to remember that it is an additive function and exploit the parallel axis and the perpendicular axis theorems.

This article considers mainly symmetric mass distributions, with constant density throughout the object, and the axis of rotation is taken to be through the center of mass unless otherwise specified.

== Moments of inertia ==
The following are scalar moments of inertia. In general, the moment of inertia is a tensor; see below.

Description	Figure	Moment(s) of inertia	Notes
Point mass M at a distance r from the axis of rotation.		$I = M r^2$	A point mass does not have a moment of inertia around its own axis, but using the parallel axis theorem a moment of inertia around a distant axis of rotation is achieved.
Two point masses, m_{1} and m_{2}, with reduced mass μ and separated by a distance x, about an axis passing through the center of mass of the system and perpendicular to the line joining the two particles.		$I = \frac{ m_1 m_2 }{ m_1 \! + \! m_2 } x^2 = \mu x^2$	Both bodies are treated as point masses: dots of different size indicate the difference in masses of bodies, not in their sizes.
Thin rod of length L and mass m, perpendicular to the axis of rotation, rotating about its center.		$I_\mathrm{center} = \frac{1}{12} m L^2 \,\!$	This expression assumes that the rod is an infinitely thin (but rigid) wire. This is a special case of the thin rectangular plate with axis of rotation at the center of the plate, with w = L and h = 0. For the purposes of moment of inertia, the rod is equivalent to a point mass 2m/3 at the center and point masses m/6 at each end.
Thin rod of length L and mass m, perpendicular to the axis of rotation, rotating about one end.		$I_\mathrm{end} = \frac{1}{3} m L^2 \,\!$	This expression assumes that the rod is an infinitely thin (but rigid) wire. This is also a special case of the thin rectangular plate with axis of rotation at the end of the plate, with h = L and w = 0.
Thin circular loop of radius r and mass m.		$I_z = m r^2\!$ $I_x = I_y = \frac{1}{2} m r^2 \,\!$	This is a special case of a torus for a = 0 (see below), as well as of a thick-walled cylindrical tube with open ends, with r_{1} = r_{2} and h = 0
Thin, solid disk of radius r and mass m.		$I_z = \frac{1}{2}m r^2\,\!$ $I_x = I_y = \frac{1}{4} m r^2\,\!$	This is a special case of the solid cylinder, with h = 0. That $I_x = I_y = \frac{I_z}{2}\,$ is a consequence of the perpendicular axis theorem.
A uniform annulus (disk with a concentric hole) of mass m, inner radius r_{1} and outer radius r_{2}		$I_z=\frac{1}{2}m(r_1^2+r_2^2)$ $I_x=I_y=\frac{1}{4}m(r_1^2+r_2^2)$	
An annulus with a constant area density $\rho_A$		$I_z=\frac{1}{2}\pi\rho_A(r_2^4-r_1^4)$ $I_x=I_y=\frac{1}{4}\pi\rho_A(r_2^4-r_1^4)$	
Thin cylindrical shell with open ends, of radius r and mass m.		$I = m r^2 \,\!$	The expression ″thin″ indicates that the shell thickness is negligible. It is a special case of the thick-walled cylindrical tube of the same mass for r_{1} = r_{2}.
Solid cylinder of radius r, height h and mass m.		$I_z = \frac{1}{2} m r^2\,\!$ $I_x = I_y = \frac{1}{12} m \left(3r^2+h^2\right)$	This is a special case of the thick-walled cylindrical tube, with r_{1} = 0.
Thick-walled cylindrical tube with open ends, of inner radius r_{1}, outer radius r_{2}, length h and mass m.		$I_z = \frac{1}{2} m \left(r_2^2 + r_1^2\right) = m r_2^2 \left(1-t+\frac{t^2}{2}\right)$ where $t=\frac{r_2-r_1}{r_2}$ is a normalized thickness ratio; $I_x = I_y = \frac{1}{12} m \left(3\left(r_2^2 + r_1^2\right)+h^2\right)$	The given formula is for the $xy$ plane passing through the center of mass, which coincides with the geometric center of the cylinder. If the xy plane is at the base of the cylinder, i.e. offset by $d=\frac h2,$ then by the parallel axis theorem the following formula applies: $I_x = I_y = \frac{1}{12} m \left(3\left(r_2^2 + r_1^2\right)+4h^2\right)$
With a density of ρ and the same geometry		$I_z = \frac{\pi\rho h}{2} \left(r_2^4 - r_1^4\right)$ $I_x = I_y = \frac{\pi\rho h}{12} \left(3(r_2^4 - r_1^4)+h^2(r_2^2 - r_1^2)\right)$	
Regular tetrahedron of side s and mass m with an axis of rotation passing through a tetrahedron's vertex and its center of mass		$I_\mathrm{solid} = \frac{1}{20} m s^2\,\!$ $I_\mathrm{hollow} = \frac{1}{12} m s^2\,\!$	For the purposes of moment of inertia, a solid tetrahedron is equivalent to a point mass 4m/5 at the center of mass and point masses m/20 at each vertex.
Regular octahedron of side s and mass m		$I_{x, \mathrm{hollow}}=I_{y, \mathrm{hollow}}=I_{z, \mathrm{hollow}} = \frac{1}{6} m s^2\,\!$ $I_{x, \mathrm{solid}} = I_{y, \mathrm{solid}} = I_{z, \mathrm{solid}} = \frac{1}{10}m s^2\,\!$	
Regular dodecahedron of side s and mass m		$I_{x, \mathrm{hollow}}=I_{y, \mathrm{hollow}}=I_{z, \mathrm{hollow}} = \frac{39\phi+28}{90}m s^2$ $I_{x, \mathrm{solid}}=I_{y, \mathrm{solid}}=I_{z, \mathrm{solid}} = \frac{39\phi+28}{150}m s^2\,\!$ (where $\phi=\frac{1+\sqrt{5}}{2}$)	
Regular icosahedron of side s and mass m		$I_{x, \mathrm{hollow}}=I_{y, \mathrm{hollow}}=I_{z, \mathrm{hollow}} = \frac{\phi^2}{6} m s^2$ $I_{x, \mathrm{solid}}=I_{y, \mathrm{solid}}=I_{z, \mathrm{solid}} = \frac{\phi^2}{10} m s^2 \,\!$	
Hollow sphere of radius r and mass m.		$I = \frac{2}{3} m r^2\,\!$	
Solid sphere (ball) of radius r and mass m.		$I = \frac{2}{5} m r^2\,\!$	
Sphere (shell) of radius r_{2} and mass m, with centered spherical cavity of radius r_{1}.		$I = \frac{2}{5} m\cdot\frac{r_2^5 - r_1^5}{r_2^3 - r_1^3}\,\!$	When the cavity radius r_{1} = 0, the object is a solid ball (above). When r_{1} becomes close to r_{2} the ratio $\frac{r_2^5 - r_1^5}{r_2^3 - r_1^3}$ approaches the value of $\frac{5}{3} r_2^2$, and in the limit the body becomes a thin hollow sphere with $I=\frac 25m\cdot \frac 53 r_2^2 = \frac 23 mr_2^2.$
Right circular cone with radius r, height h, and mass m		$I_z = \frac{3}{10} mr^2 \,\!$ About an axis passing through the tip: $I_x = I_y = m \left(\frac{3}{20} r^2 + \frac{3}{5} h^2\right) \,\!$ About an axis passing through the base: $I_x = I_y = m \left(\frac{3}{20} r^2 + \frac{1}{10} h^2\right) \,\!$ About an axis passing through the center of mass: $I_x = I_y = m \left(\frac{3}{20} r^2 + \frac{3}{80} h^2\right) \,\!$ About a slanted axis passing through the apex (origin) and along the side generating line: $I_{\text{slant}} = \frac{3}{20} m r^2 \left( 1 + 5 \frac{h^2}{h^2+r^2} \right) \,\!$	
Right circular hollow cone with radius r, height h, and mass m		$I_z = \frac{1}{2} mr^2 \,\!$ About an axis passing through the tip: $I_x = I_y = \frac{1}{4}m\left(r^2 + 2h^2\right) \,\!$ About an axis passing through the base: $I_x = I_y = m \left(\frac{1}{4} r^2 + \frac{1}{6} h^2\right) \,\!$About an axis passing through the center of mass:$I_x = I_y = m \left(\frac{1}{4} r^2 + \frac{1}{18} h^2\right) \,\!$	
Torus with minor radius a, major radius b and mass m.		About an axis passing through the center and perpendicular to the diameter: $\frac{1}{4}m\left(4b^2 + 3a^2\right)$ About a diameter: $\frac{1}{8}m\left(5a^2 + 4b^2\right)$	
Ellipsoid (solid) of semiaxes a, b, and c with mass m		$I_x = \frac{1}{5} m\left(b^2+c^2\right)\,\!$ $I_y = \frac{1}{5} m \left(a^2+c^2\right)\,\!$ $I_z = \frac{1}{5} m \left(a^2+b^2\right)\,\!$	
Thin rectangular plate of height h, width w and mass m (Axis of rotation at the end of the plate)		$I_e = \frac{1}{12} m \left(4h^2 + w^2\right)\,\!$	For the purposes of moment of inertia, a rectangular plate or cuboid is equivalent to a point mass 2m/3 at the center of mass and the remaining mass spread evenly between point masses at each vertex.
Thin rectangular plate of height h, width w and mass m (Axis of rotation at the center)		$I_c = \frac{1}{12} m \left(h^2 + w^2\right)\,\!$ or for a thin wire in the shape of a rectangle:$I_{c,\text{hollow}} = \frac{1}{12} m \left(h + w\right)^2\,\!$	
Thin rectangular plate of mass m, length of side adjacent to side containing axis of rotation is r (Note: Width perpendicular to the axis of rotation (side of plate); height (parallel to axis) is irrelevant.)(Axis of rotation along a side of the plate)		$I=\frac{1}{3}mr^2$	
Thin parallelogram plate of mass m, perpendicular distance from side containing axis of rotation is r (Axis of rotation along a side of the plate)		$I=\frac{1}{3}mr^2$	
Thin parallelogram plate with mass m and sides given by vectors P and Q. (Axis of rotation at the center and perpendicular to the plate)		$I_c = \frac{1}{12} m \left(|\mathbf{P}|^2 + |\mathbf{Q}|^2\right)\,\!$	For the purposes of moment of inertia, a parallelogram (or parallelepiped) is equivalent to a point mass 2m/3 at the center of mass and the remaining mass spread evenly between point masses at each vertex. This can also be written in terms of distances from centre to the vertices:$I_c=\frac{1}{6}m\left(\left|\frac{\mathbf{P+Q}}{2}\right|^2 +\left|\frac{\mathbf{P-Q}}{2}\right|^2\right)$
Thin parallelogram plate with mass m with vertices at the origin, P, Q and P + Q. (Axis of rotation at the origin and perpendicular to the plate)		$I=\frac{1}{6}m(2\mathbf{P}\cdot\mathbf{P}+3\mathbf{P}\cdot\mathbf{Q}+2\mathbf{Q}\cdot\mathbf{Q})$	The moment of inertia about the vertex P + Q would be the same (by symmetry). The moment of inertia about the other two vertices would be $I=\frac{1}{6}m(2\mathbf{P}\cdot\mathbf{P}-3\mathbf{P}\cdot\mathbf{Q}+2\mathbf{Q}\cdot\mathbf{Q})$
Thin parallelogram plate of mass m in 3D space with vertices A, B, C and D. Rotated about an axis through a point E and parallel to a unit vector L. The centre of mass is $\bar{\mathbf{X}} = \frac{\mathbf{A}+\mathbf{B}+\mathbf{C}+\mathbf{D}}{4}$Vectors parallel to the sides are$\mathbf{P} = \mathbf{B}-\mathbf{A} = \mathbf{C}-\mathbf{D}$ and $\mathbf{Q} = \mathbf{C}-\mathbf{B} = \mathbf{D}-\mathbf{A}$.		$I_{\mathbf{E},\mathbf{L}} = \frac{m}{12} \left(|\pi_\mathbf{L}\mathbf{P}|^2 + |\pi_\mathbf{L}\mathbf{Q}|^2\right) + m\left|\pi_\mathbf{L}(\mathbf{E}-\bar{\mathbf{X})}\right|^2$where $\pi_\mathbf{L} = \mathrm{I}_3 - \mathbf{L}\mathbf{L}^T$ is the projection onto the plane perpendicular to L.	This result can generate all the above results for thin rods (Q=0), thin rectangular plates and thin parallelogram plates. If the plate is replaced by a thin wire along the boundary, then the m/12 term is replaced by m/6.
Solid rectangular cuboid of height h, width w, and depth d, and mass m.		$I_h = \frac{1}{12} m \left(w^2+d^2\right)$ $I_w = \frac{1}{12} m \left(d^2+h^2\right)$ $I_d = \frac{1}{12} m \left(w^2+h^2\right)$	For a cube with sides $s$, $I = \frac{1}{6} m s^2\,\!$.
Solid cuboid of height D, width W, and length L, and mass m, rotating about the longest diagonal.		$I = \frac{1}{6}m \left(\frac{W^2D^2+D^2L^2+W^2L^2}{W^2+D^2+L^2}\right)$	For a cube with sides $s$, $I = \frac{1}{6} m s^2\,\!$.
Tilted solid cuboid of depth d, width w, and length l, and mass m, tilted at angle $\beta$, rotating about the vertical axis (axis z as seen in figure).		$I = \frac{m}{12} \left(l^2 \cos^2\beta + d^2 \sin^2\beta + w^2\right)$	For a cube with sides $s$, $I = \frac{1}{6} m s^2\,\!$.
Solid parallelepiped of mass m with vertices $\mathbf{A}_{ijk} = \mathbf{A}+i\mathbf{P} + j\mathbf{Q}+k\mathbf{R}$ for $i,j,k \in \{0,1\}$Rotated about an axis through a point E and parallel to a unit vector L. The centre of mass is $\bar{\mathbf{X}} = \mathbf{A}+\frac{\mathbf{P}+\mathbf{Q}+\mathbf{R}}{2}$		$I_{\mathbf{E},\mathbf{L}} = \frac{1}{12} m \left(|\pi_\mathbf{L}\mathbf{P}|^2 + |\pi_\mathbf{L}\mathbf{Q}|^2+ |\pi_\mathbf{L}\mathbf{R}|^2\right)$ $\phantom{IEL=}+ m\left|\pi_\mathbf{L}(\mathbf{E}-\bar{\mathbf{X})}\right|^2$where $\pi_\mathbf{L} = \mathrm{I}_3 - \mathbf{L}\mathbf{L}^T$ is the projection onto the plane perpendicular to L.	For the purposes of moment of inertia, a parallelepiped is equivalent to a point mass 2m/3 at the center of mass and the remaining mass spread evenly between point masses at each vertex. This result generates the above results for solid cuboids. Additionally, by letting $\mathbf{R} = \mathbf{0}$ lower dimension cases are also recovered. For a hollow parallelepiped the m/12 term is replaced by 5m/36.
Triangle with vertices at the origin and at P and Q, with mass m, rotating about an axis perpendicular to the plane and passing through the origin.		$I=\frac{1}{6}m(\mathbf{P}\cdot\mathbf{P}+\mathbf{P}\cdot\mathbf{Q}+\mathbf{Q}\cdot\mathbf{Q})$	For the purposes of moment of inertia, a triangle is equivalent to a point mass 3m/4 at the center of mass and point masses m/12 at each vertex. So this result can also be written as $I=\frac{1}{12}m\left(|\mathbf{P}|^2 + |\mathbf{Q}|^2\right) + \frac{3}{4}m \left|\frac{\mathbf{P}+\mathbf{Q}}{3}\right|^2$
Triangle with side lengths a, b, c, with mass m, rotating about an axis perpendicular to the plane and passing through the center of mass.		$I=\frac{1}{36}m(a^2+b^2+c^2)$	These triangle results can be generated from each other using the parallel axis theorem. This result can also be written as$I=\frac{1}{12}m(r_1^2+r_2^2+r_3^2)$ where r_{1}, r_{2}, and r_{3} are the distances from the center of mass to the vertices.
Plane polygon with vertices P_{1}, P_{2}, P_{3}, ..., P_{N} and mass m uniformly distributed on its interior, rotating about an axis perpendicular to the plane and passing through the origin.		$I = m \frac{\sum\limits_{n=1}^N Q_n \left\|\mathbf{P}_{n+1} \times \mathbf{P}_n\right\|}{6 \sum\limits_{n=1}^{N} \left\|\mathbf{P}_{n+1} \times \mathbf{P}_n\right\|}$ where $Q_n = \left\|\mathbf{P}_n \right\|^2 +\mathbf{P}_{n} \cdot \mathbf{P}_{n+1} + \left\|\mathbf{P}_{n+1}\right\|^2$	Construct triangles with vertices at origin, P_{n}, P_{n+1}. Use triangle result above to find moment of inertia about the origin for each. Then take a weighted average of the moments, weighting by the area of each triangle.
An isosceles triangle of mass M, vertex angle 2β and common-side length L (axis through tip, perpendicular to plane)		$I=\frac{1}{2} mL^2 \left(1 - \frac{2}{3}\sin^2\left(\beta\right)\right)$	Can be generated using triangle result about a vertex above.
Plane regular polygon with n-vertices and mass m uniformly distributed on its interior, rotating about an axis perpendicular to the plane and passing through its barycenter. R is the radius of the circumscribed circle.		$I=\frac{1}{2}mR^2\left(1 - \frac{2}{3}\sin^2\left(\tfrac{\pi}{n}\right)\right)$	Split the polygon into n triangles, all with the barycenter as one vertex, and the other two vertices from the polygon. Each triangle is an isosceles triangle with side length R , angle $\frac{2\pi}{n}$ and mass $\frac{m}{n}$. Sum the moments for each triangle (using the previous result) to get the answer.
Infinite disk with mass distributed in a Bivariate Gaussian distribution on two axes around the axis of rotation with mass-density as a function of the position vector ${\mathbf x}$ $$\rho({\mathbf x}) = m\frac{\exp\left(-\frac 1 2 {\mathbf x}^\mathrm{T}{\boldsymbol\Sigma}^{-1}{\mathbf x}\right)}{\sqrt{(2\pi)^2|\boldsymbol\Sigma|}}$$		$I = m \cdot \operatorname{tr}({\boldsymbol\Sigma}) \,\!$	

For 'hollow' versions of some uniformly distributed solids, the ratio of moments of inertia is based on the dimension. More precisely, if the 'hollow' version is generated from a scaling of the solid (more precisely a homothety), in n dimensions, about a point on the axis of rotation, then the ratio of the formula for the moments of inertia is $\frac{n+2}{n}$.

To illustrate from above: the 'hollow' version of a solid disk (based on a 2 dimensional scaling about the centre) is a circle. The ratio of the moments of inertia is $\frac{2+2}{2} = 2$. A thin cylindrical shell is a 'hollow' version of a solid cylinder based on a 2 dimensional scaling (about the central axis: in x and y dimensions in the example above) and so the ratio is again 2. For the hollow and solid sphere the ratio is $\frac{3+2}{3} = \frac{5}{3}$ since the hollowing is based on a 3 dimensional homothety about the centre. Regular polyhedrons have similar ratios. The hollow cone is based on a scaling about the centre of the base. So formulas based on axes that pass through the centre of the base will follow the pattern.

== List of 3D inertia tensors ==
This list of moment of inertia tensors is given for principal axes of each object.

To obtain the scalar moments of inertia I above, the tensor moment of inertia I is projected along some axis defined by a unit vector n according to the formula:

$$\mathbf{n}\cdot\mathbf{I}\cdot\mathbf{n}\equiv n_i I_{ij} n_j\,,$$

where the dots indicate tensor contraction and the Einstein summation convention is used. In the above table, n would be the unit Cartesian basis e_{x}, e_{y}, e_{z} to obtain I_{x}, I_{y}, I_{z} respectively.

Description	Figure	Moment of inertia tensor
Solid sphere of radius r and mass m		$$I = \begin{bmatrix} \frac{2}{5} m r^2 & 0 & 0 \\ 0 & \frac{2}{5} m r^2 & 0 \\ 0 & 0 & \frac{2}{5} m r^2 \end{bmatrix}$$
Hollow sphere of radius r and mass m		$$I = \begin{bmatrix} \frac{2}{3} m r^2 & 0 & 0 \\ 0 & \frac{2}{3} m r^2 & 0 \\ 0 & 0 & \frac{2}{3} m r^2 \end{bmatrix}$$
Solid ellipsoid of semi-axes a, b, c and mass m		$$I = \begin{bmatrix} \frac{1}{5} m (b^2+c^2) & 0 & 0 \\ 0 & \frac{1}{5} m (a^2+c^2) & 0 \\ 0 & 0 & \frac{1}{5} m (a^2+b^2) \end{bmatrix}$$
Right circular cone with radius r, height h and mass m, about the apex		$$I = \begin{bmatrix} \frac{3}{5} m h^2 + \frac{3}{20} m r^2 & 0 & 0 \\ 0 & \frac{3}{5} m h^2 + \frac{3}{20} m r^2 & 0 \\ 0 & 0 & \frac{3}{10} m r^2 \end{bmatrix}$$
Slender rod along y-axis of length h and mass m about end		$$I = \begin{bmatrix} \frac{1}{3} m h^2 & 0 & 0 \\ 0 & 0 & 0 \\ 0 & 0 & \frac{1}{3} m h^2 \end{bmatrix}$$
Slender rod along y-axis of length h and mass m about center		$$I = \begin{bmatrix} \frac{1}{12} m h^2 & 0 & 0 \\ 0 & 0 & 0 \\ 0 & 0 & \frac{1}{12} m h^2 \end{bmatrix}$$
Solid rectangular plate of width w (x-direction) and height h (y-direction), and mass m	Rectangular plane with width w (x-direction) and height h (y-direction)	$$I = \begin{bmatrix} \frac{1}{12} m h^2 & 0 & 0 \\ 0 & \frac{1}{12} m w^2 & 0 \\ 0 & 0 & \frac{1}{12} m (w^2 + h^2) \end{bmatrix}$$
Solid cuboid of width w (x-direction), height h (y-direction), depth d (z-direction), and mass m	180x	$$I = \begin{bmatrix} \frac{1}{12} m (h^2 + d^2) & 0 & 0 \\ 0 & \frac{1}{12} m (w^2 + d^2) & 0 \\ 0 & 0 & \frac{1}{12} m (w^2 + h^2) \end{bmatrix}$$
Solid cylinder of radius r, height h and mass m		$$I = \begin{bmatrix} \frac{1}{12} m (3r^2+h^2) & 0 & 0 \\ 0 & \frac{1}{12} m (3r^2+h^2) & 0 \\ 0 & 0 & \frac{1}{2} m r^2\end{bmatrix}$$
Thick-walled cylindrical tube with open ends, of inner radius r_{1}, outer radius r_{2}, length h and mass m		$$I = \begin{bmatrix} \frac{1}{12} m (3(r_2^2 + r_1^2)+h^2) & 0 & 0 \\ 0 & \frac{1}{12} m (3(r_2^2 + r_1^2)+h^2) & 0 \\ 0 & 0 & \frac{1}{2} m (r_2^2 + r_1^2)\end{bmatrix}$$

== See also ==
- List of second moments of area
- Parallel axis theorem
- Perpendicular axis theorem
