= Perpendicular axis theorem =

Mathematical theorem

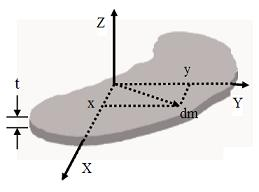

The perpendicular axis theorem (or plane figure theorem) states that for a planar lamina the moment of inertia about an axis perpendicular to the plane of the lamina is equal to the sum of the moments of inertia about two mutually perpendicular axes in the plane of the lamina, which intersect at the point where the perpendicular axis passes through. This theorem applies only to planar bodies and is valid when the body lies entirely in a single plane.

Define perpendicular axes $x$, $y$, and $z$ (which meet at origin $O$) so that the body lies in the $xy$ plane, and the $z$ axis is perpendicular to the plane of the body. Let I_{x}, I_{y} and I_{z} be moments of inertia about axis x, y, z respectively. Then the perpendicular axis theorem states that

$$I_z = I_x + I_y$$

This rule can be applied with the parallel axis theorem and the stretch rule to find polar moments of inertia for a variety of shapes.

If a planar object has rotational symmetry such that $I_x$ and $I_y$ are equal, then the perpendicular axes theorem provides the useful relationship:

$$I_z = 2I_x = 2I_y$$

== Derivation ==
Working in Cartesian coordinates, the moment of inertia of the planar body about the $z$ axis is given by:

$$I_{z} = \int (x^2 + y^2) \,dm = \int x^2\,dm + \int y^2\,dm = I_{y} + I_{x}$$

On the plane, $z=0$, so these two terms are the moments of inertia about the $x$ and $y$ axes respectively, giving the perpendicular axis theorem. The converse of this theorem is also derived similarly.

Note that $\int x^2\,dm = I_{y} \ne I_{x}$ because in $\int r^2\,dm$, $r$ measures the distance from the axis of rotation, so for a y-axis rotation, deviation distance from the axis of rotation of a point is equal to its x coordinate.

== See also ==
- Parallel axis theorem
- Stretch rule
