= Stretch rule =

Classical mechanics rule

In classical mechanics, the stretch rule (sometimes referred to as Routh's rule) states that the moment of inertia of a rigid object is unchanged when the object is stretched parallel to an axis of rotation that is a principal axis, provided that the distribution of mass remains unchanged except in the direction parallel to the axis. This operation leaves cylinders oriented parallel to the axis unchanged in radius.

This rule can be applied with the parallel axis theorem and the perpendicular axis theorem to find moments of inertia for a variety of shapes.

== Derivation ==
The (scalar) moment of inertia of a rigid body around the z-axis is given by:

$$I_z = \int_V d^3 r \, \rho(\mathbf{r})\,r^2$$

Where $r$ is the distance of a point from the z-axis. We can expand as follows, since we are dealing with stretching over the z-axis only:

$$I_z = \int_0^L dz \int_{x,y} dx \, dy \, \rho(x, y, z)\,r^2$$

Here, $L$ is the body's height. Stretching the object by a factor of $a$ along the z-axis is equivalent to dividing the mass density by $a$ (meaning $\rho'(x, y, z) = \rho(x, y, z/a)/a$), as well as integrating over new limits $0$ and $aL$ (the new height of the object), thus leaving the total mass unchanged. This means the new moment of inertia will be:

$$\begin{align}
I_z' & = \int_0^{aL} dz \int_{x,y} dx \, dy \, \rho'(x, y, z) \,r^2 \\[8pt]
& = \int_0^L a \, dz' \int_{x,y} dx \, dy \, \frac{\rho(x, y, z/a)}{a} \,r^2 \\[8pt]
& = \int_0^L dz' \int_{x,y} dx \, dy \, \rho(x, y, z') \,r^2 = I_z
\end{align}$$
