= Stabiliser (archery) =

Stabilisers in use at an archery competition

In archery, a stabiliser is a general term for various types of weights, usually on rods, mounted on the bow to increase stability i.e. lessen movement on release, thereby increasing precision. Stabilisers help reduce inconsistency in the archer's release by increasing the moment of inertia of the bow. If the shooting technique of the archer were perfect, no stabilisers would be required.

Precision comes from repeatability. The reduction of inadvertent movements enhances repeatability. The various types of stabilisers are each designed to minimise a particular direction of movement. These movements are those that may occur between the instant of true aim/string release, and the arrow flying free: not "follow-through" and similar activities, which merely indicate what went before. All weight added to the centre section will reduce trembling or shake during the aim, but energy to hold the bow against gravity will obviously increase. Also, the addition of weight will change the shooting characteristics and matching of the arrows to the bow. The successful addition of stabilisers can only be achieved by actual testing and precise groupings.

All bodies have inertia, and it is static inertia and non-static inertia that bow-weights "use", which means that they resist movement. Consequently, on the application of any force on the bow, e.g. (1) muscular force, whether voluntary or involuntary: (2) the reaction of the bow to the acceleration of the bow limbs, string and arrow: (3) the further reaction of the bow as the string becomes taut and the arrow flies free: the actual physical movement of the bow centre section will be less with the addition of weights than it would have been without. Clearly, the forces acting on the centre section are potentially the same on any shot, and by increasing the static inertia, movement will be reduced.

== Poker stabiliser ==
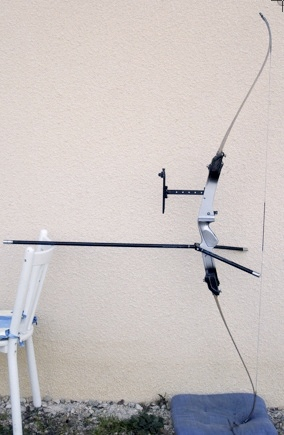
A bow with long-rod and reverse stabilisers

A long-rod stabiliser holds a weight in front of the bow. It is usually fitted into the centre section in line with the bow arm, or just below the hand position. The addition of this weight moves the centre of gravity of the bow forwards, with two results.

First, "torque" effect (sideways twisting of the bow-hand) movement is reduced. At full draw, the string prevents the bow from twisting, but on release, the bow can turn sideways to some degree, directing the arrow to the left or right. But with the forward centre of gravity, the effect is reduced. Similarly, "topping" (upwards) or "heeling" (downwards) inconsistencies of the bow-hand are reduced.

Second, with actual movement of the bow-hand sideways, up, down, or any combination, because the centre of gravity is in front of the hand, the bow will turn in the opposite direction, to correct, to some degree, the archer's error.

There is also an effect that does not actually give enhanced accuracy or precision, but there are times when this can still be helpful except in the mind of the archer: the pleasing "forward roll" of the bow, as part of the follow-through, with a relaxed bow-hand and forward centre of gravity.

== Twin or limb stabilisers ==
Fitted above and below the bow-hand, normally close to where the limbs meet the centre section, these have similar effects to the single long-rod, but also have a third effect. Because of their positioning, the twin weights also resist rotation instigated by a bow-hand error. If this error were not reduced, left or right shots would occur, because the aiming of the arrow takes gravity into account to gauge the trajectory. Consequently, with perfect aim, if the bow rotates on release, the effect will be the same as not holding the bow vertically, i.e. left or right.

Similarly to the long-rod, a "forward roll" will be induced on release and, in addition, because the twin stabilisers are positioned at the base of the limbs, depending on the rigidity of the mounts, some vibration may be damped, giving a smoother feel to the shot.

== Reverse or counterbalance stabilisers ==
Fitted usually below the bow-hand on the centre section, because they point back towards the archer, they bring the Center of Gravity backwards. Consequently, they are typically used in conjunction with a long-rod stabiliser, the long-rod having sufficient turning moment to exceed the negative effect of the reverse weights, and so keep the forward roll of the bow on release, this being generally accepted as a desirable feature. Hence, the forward centre of gravity effect will not be as great, but, because the reverse weight or weights are extended horizontally from the vertical centre section, their effect is to reduce vertical turning caused by bow-hand torque. This is, of course, in addition to any long-rod stabiliser anti-torque effect.

== Use and summary ==
Consider the bow as being potentially on a pivot at the pressure point of the bow-hand. If the archer applies inadvertent pressure off centre of the pressure point, then inadvertent movement of the bow will result, with loss of precision. By careful study of the bow's movement, the appropriate positioning and addition of weight(s) may be tried, to reduce errors, although prevention is better than cure.

Further, various types of the bow stabilizers have been used, to allow some degree of flexure between the bow and the stabiliser weight. Similarly, the weight may be on an extension rod that may flex in itself. The object of the exercise should be kept in mind, and that object is to reduce bow inadvertent movement. Any flexure will allow some movement of the bow, without similar movement of the weight, hence lessening the weight inertia. However, many archers have found an apparent improvement in their precision with the use of flex / mounts. The weight in hand remains unchanged, and so may contribute to steadiness of aim. Also, the flexing gives a "rubbery" feeling, as though the bow wants to remain steady on aim. Consequently, it may be that such effect helps the archer's feeling of confidence on the shot, thereby contributing to precision.
