= Parallel axis theorem =

Theorem in planar dynamics

The parallel axis theorem, also known as Huygens–Steiner theorem, or just as Steiner's theorem, named after Christiaan Huygens and Jakob Steiner, can be used to determine the moment of inertia or the second moment of area of a rigid body about any axis, given the body's moment of inertia about a parallel axis through the object's center of gravity and the perpendicular distance between the axes.

== Mass moment of inertia ==
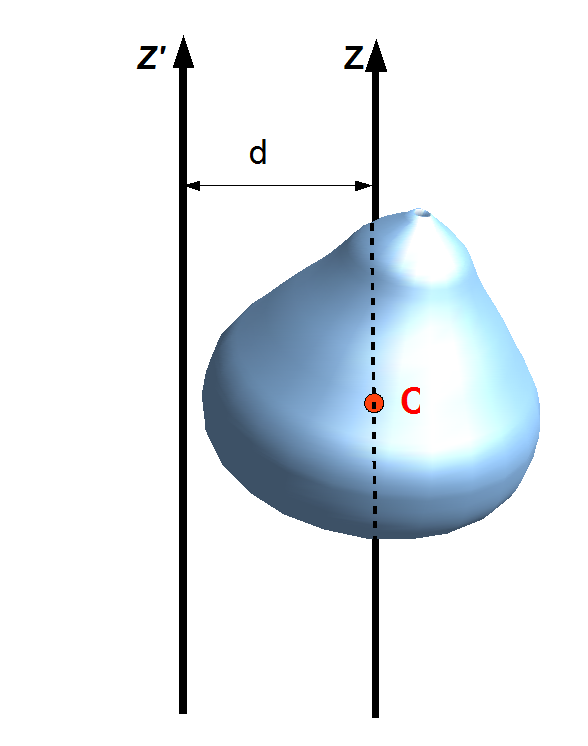
The mass moment of inertia of a body around an axis can be determined from the mass moment of inertia around a parallel axis through the center of mass.

Suppose a body of mass m is rotated about an axis z passing through the body's center of mass. The body has a moment of inertia I_{cm} with respect to this axis. The parallel axis theorem states that if the body is made to rotate instead about a new axis z′, which is parallel to the first axis and displaced from it by a distance d, then the moment of inertia I with respect to the new axis is related to I_{cm} by

$$I = I_\mathrm{cm} + md^2.$$

Explicitly, d is the perpendicular distance between the axes z and z′.

The parallel axis theorem can be applied with the stretch rule and perpendicular axis theorem to find moments of inertia for a variety of shapes.

Parallel axes rule for area moment of inertia

=== Derivation ===
We may assume, without loss of generality, that in a Cartesian coordinate system the perpendicular distance between the axes lies along the x-axis and that the center of mass lies at the origin. The moment of inertia relative to the z-axis is then

$$I_\mathrm{cm} = \int (x^2 + y^2) \, dm.$$

The moment of inertia relative to the axis z′, which is at a distance D from the center of mass along the x-axis, is

$$I = \int \left[(x - D)^2 + y^2\right] \, dm.$$

Expanding the brackets yields

$$I = \int (x^2 + y^2) \, dm + D^2 \int dm - 2D\int x\, dm.$$

The first term is I_{cm} and the second term becomes MD^{2}. The integral in the final term is a multiple of the x-coordinate of the center of mass – which is zero since the center of mass lies at the origin. So, the equation becomes:

$$I = I_\mathrm{cm} + MD^2.$$

=== Tensor generalization ===
The parallel axis theorem can be generalized to calculations involving the inertia tensor. Let I_{ij} denote the inertia tensor of a body as calculated at the center of mass. Then the inertia tensor J_{ij} as calculated relative to a new point is

$$J_{ij}=I_{ij} + m\left(|\mathbf{R}|^2 \delta_{ij}-R_i R_j\right),$$

where $\mathbf{R}=R_1\mathbf{\hat{x}}+R_2\mathbf{\hat{y}}+R_3\mathbf{\hat{z}}\!$ is the displacement vector from the center of mass to the new point, and δ_{ij} is the Kronecker delta.

For diagonal elements (when i = j), displacements perpendicular to the axis of rotation results in the above simplified version of the parallel axis theorem.

The generalized version of the parallel axis theorem can be expressed in the form of coordinate-free notation as

$$\mathbf{J} = \mathbf{I} + m \left[\left(\mathbf{R} \cdot \mathbf{R}\right) \mathbf{E}_{3} - \mathbf{R} \otimes \mathbf{R} \right],$$

where E_{3} is the 3 × 3 identity matrix and $\otimes$ is the outer product.

Further generalization of the parallel axis theorem gives the inertia tensor about any set of orthogonal axes parallel to the reference set of axes x, y and z, associated with the reference inertia tensor, whether or not they pass through the center of mass. In this generalization, the inertia tensor can be moved from being reckoned about any reference point $\mathbf{R}_{ref}$ to some final reference point $\mathbf{R}_F$ via the relational matrix $M$ as:

$$I_{F} = I_\mathrm{ref} + m(M[\mathbf{R},\mathbf{R}] - 2M[\mathbf{R},\mathbf{C}])$$

where $\mathbf{C}$ is the vector from the initial reference point to the object's center of mass and $\mathbf{R}$ is the vector from the initial reference point to the final reference point ($\mathbf{R}_F = \mathbf{R}_{ref} + \mathbf{R}$). The relational matrix is given by

$$M[\mathbf{r},\mathbf{c}] = \left[\begin{array}{rrr}(r_y c_y + r_z c_z) & -1/2(r_x c_y + r_y c_x) & -1/2(r_x c_z + r_z c_x) \\
-1/2(r_x c_y + r_y c_x) & (r_x c_x + r_z c_z) & -1/2(r_y c_z + r_z c_y) \\
-1/2(r_x c_z + r_z c_x) & -1/2(r_y c_z + r_z c_y) & (r_x c_x + r_y c_y) \end{array}\right]$$

== Second moment of area ==
The parallel axes rule also applies to the second moment of area (area moment of inertia) for a plane region D:

$$I_z = I_x + Ar^2,$$

where I_{z} is the area moment of inertia of D relative to the parallel axis, I_{x} is the area moment of inertia of D relative to its centroid, A is the area of the plane region D, and r is the distance from the new axis z to the centroid of the plane region D. The centroid of D coincides with the centre of gravity of a physical plate with the same shape that has uniform density.

== Polar moment of inertia for planar dynamics ==
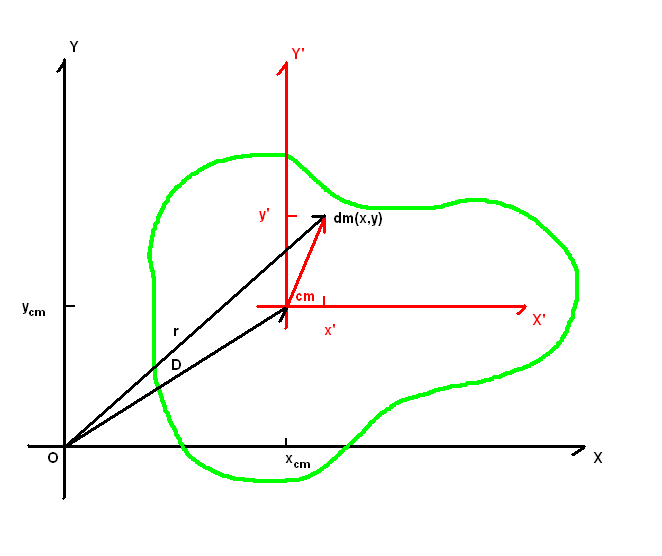
Polar moment of inertia of a body around a point can be determined from its polar moment of inertia around the center of mass.

The mass properties of a rigid body that is constrained to move parallel to a plane are defined by its center of mass R = (x, y) in this plane, and its polar moment of inertia I_{R} around an axis through R that is perpendicular to the plane. The parallel axis theorem provides a convenient relationship between the moment of inertia I_{S} around an arbitrary point S and the moment of inertia I_{R} about the center of mass R.

Recall that the center of mass R has the property

$$\int_V \rho(\mathbf{r}) (\mathbf{r}-\mathbf{R}) \, dV=0,$$

where r is integrated over the volume V of the body. The polar moment of inertia of a body undergoing planar movement can be computed relative to any reference point S,

$$I_S = \int_V \rho(\mathbf{r}) (\mathbf{r}-\mathbf{S})\cdot (\mathbf{r}-\mathbf{S}) \, dV,$$

where S is constant and r is integrated over the volume V.

In order to obtain the moment of inertia I_{S} in terms of the moment of inertia I_{R}, introduce the vector d from S to the center of mass R,

$$\begin{align}
I_S & = \int_V \rho(\mathbf{r})  (\mathbf{r}-\mathbf{R}+\mathbf{d})\cdot (\mathbf{r}-\mathbf{R}+\mathbf{d}) \, dV \\
& = \int_V \rho(\mathbf{r}) (\mathbf{r}-\mathbf{R})\cdot (\mathbf{r}-\mathbf{R})dV + 2\mathbf{d}\cdot\left(\int_V \rho(\mathbf{r})  (\mathbf{r}-\mathbf{R}) \, dV\right) + \left(\int_V \rho(\mathbf{r}) \, dV\right)\mathbf{d}\cdot\mathbf{d}.
\end{align}$$

The first term is the moment of inertia I_{R}, the second term is zero by definition of the center of mass, and the last term is the total mass of the body times the square magnitude of the vector d. Thus,

$$I_S = I_R + Md^2, \,$$

which is known as the parallel axis theorem.

== Moment of inertia matrix ==
The inertia matrix of a rigid system of particles depends on the choice of the reference point. There is a useful relationship between the inertia matrix relative to the center of mass R and the inertia matrix relative to another point S. This relationship is called the parallel axis theorem.

Consider the inertia matrix [I_{S}] obtained for a rigid system of particles measured relative to a reference point S, given by

$$[I_S] = -\sum_{i=1}^n m_i[r_i-S][r_i-S],$$

where r_{i} defines the position of particle P_{i}, i = 1, ..., n. Recall that [r_{i} − S] is the skew-symmetric matrix that performs the cross product,

$$[r_i -S]\mathbf{y} = (\mathbf{r}_i - \mathbf{S})\times \mathbf{y},$$

for an arbitrary vector y.

Let R be the center of mass of the rigid system, then

$$\mathbf{R} = (\mathbf{R}-\mathbf{S}) + \mathbf{S} = \mathbf{d} + \mathbf{S},$$

where d is the vector from the reference point S to the center of mass R. Use this equation to compute the inertia matrix,

$$[I_S] = -\sum_{i=1}^n m_i[r_i- R + d][r_i - R+ d].$$

Expand this equation to obtain

$$[I_S] =  \left(-\sum_{i=1}^n m_i [r_i - R][r_i - R]\right) + \left(-\sum_{i=1}^n m_i[r_i - R]\right)[d] +  [d]\left(-\sum_{i=1}^n m_i[r_i - R]\right) + \left(-\sum_{i=1}^n m_i\right)[d][d].$$

The first term is the inertia matrix [I_{R}] relative to the center of mass. The second and third terms are zero by definition of the center of mass R,

$$\sum_{i=1}^n m_i(\mathbf{r}_i -\mathbf{R}) = 0.$$

And the last term is the total mass of the system multiplied by the square of the skew-symmetric matrix [d] constructed from d.

The result is the parallel axis theorem,

$$[I_S] = [I_R] - M[d]^2,$$

where d is the vector from the reference point S to the center of mass R.

=== Identities for a skew-symmetric matrix ===
In order to compare formulations of the parallel axis theorem using skew-symmetric matrices and the tensor formulation, the following identities are useful.

Let [R] be the skew symmetric matrix associated with the position vector R = (x, y, z), then the product in the inertia matrix becomes

$$-[R][R]= -\begin{bmatrix} 0 & -z & y \\ z & 0 & -x \\ -y & x & 0 \end{bmatrix}^2 = \begin{bmatrix}
y^2+z^2 & -xy & -xz \\ -y x & x^2+z^2 & -yz \\ -zx & -zy & x^2+y^2 \end{bmatrix}.$$

This product can be computed using the matrix formed by the outer product [R R^{T}] using the identity

$$-[R]^2 = |\mathbf{R}|^2[E_3] -[\mathbf{R}\mathbf{R}^T]=
\begin{bmatrix} x^2+y^2+z^2 & 0 & 0 \\  0& x^2+y^2+z^2 & 0 \\0& 0& x^2+y^2+z^2 \end{bmatrix}- \begin{bmatrix}x^2 & xy & xz \\ yx & y^2 & yz \\ zx & zy & z^2\end{bmatrix},$$

where [E_{3}] is the 3 × 3 identity matrix.

Also notice, that

$$|\mathbf{R}|^2 = \mathbf{R}\cdot\mathbf{R} =\operatorname{tr}[\mathbf{R}\mathbf{R}^T],$$

where tr denotes the sum of the diagonal elements of the outer product matrix, known as its trace.

== See also ==
- Christiaan Huygens
- Jakob Steiner
- Moment of inertia
- Perpendicular axis theorem
- Rigid body dynamics
- Stretch rule
