= Planar lamina =

Mathematical model of a thin, flat object

In mathematics, a planar lamina (or plane lamina) is a plane figure representing a thin, usually uniform, flat layer of a solid. It serves also as an idealized model of a planar cross section of a solid body in integration. Planar laminas can be used to determine moments of inertia, or center of mass of figures, as well as an aid in corresponding calculations for 3D bodies.

== Definition ==
A planar lamina is defined as a figure (a closed set) D of a finite area in a plane, with some mass m.

This is useful in calculating moments of inertia or center of mass for a constant density, because the mass of a lamina is proportional to its area. In a case of a variable density, given by some (non-negative) surface density function $\rho(x,y),$ the mass $m$ of the planar lamina D is a planar integral of ρ over the figure:

$$m = \iint_D\rho(x,y)\,dx\,dy$$

== Properties ==
The center of mass of the lamina is at the point

$$\left(\frac{M_y}{m},\frac{M_x}{m}\right)$$

where $M_y$ is the moment of the entire lamina about the y-axis and $M_x$ is the moment of the entire lamina about the x-axis:

$$\begin{align}
M_y &= \lim_{m,n \to \infty} \, \sum_{i=1}^m \sum_{j=1}^n x_{ij}^* \,\rho(x_{ij}^*, y_{ij}^*) \, \Delta D
= \iint_D x\, \rho(x,y) \, dx \, dy \\[1ex]
M_x &= \lim_{m,n \to \infty} \, \sum_{i=1}^m \sum_{j=1}^n y_{ij}^* \,\rho(x_{ij}^*, y_{ij}^*) \, \Delta D
= \iint_D y\, \rho(x,y) \, dx \, dy
\end{align}$$

with summation and integration taken over a planar domain $D$.

== Example ==
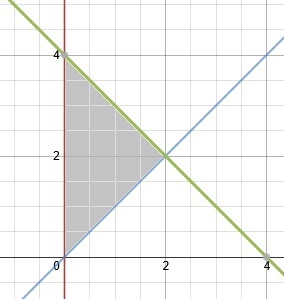

Find the center of mass of a lamina with edges given by the lines $x=0,$ $y=x$ and $y=4-x$ where the density is given as $\rho(x,y) = 2x + 3y + 2$.

For this the mass $m$ must be found as well as the moments $M_y$ and $M_x$.

Mass is $m = \iint_D\rho(x,y)\,dx\,dy$ which can be equivalently expressed as an iterated integral:

$$m = \int_{x=0}^2 \int_{y=x}^{4-x} \left(2x + 3y + 2\right) dy\,dx$$

The inner integral is:

$$\begin{align}
& \int_{y=x}^{4-x} \,(2x+3y+2)\,dy \\[1ex]
& = \left[2xy + \frac{3}{2} y^2 + 2y\right]_{y=x}^{y=4-x} \\[1ex]
& = \left[2x \left(4-x\right) + \frac{3}{2} \left(4-x\right)^2 + 2 \left(4-x\right)\right] - \left[2x^2 + \frac{3}{2} x^2 + 2x\right] \\[1ex]
& = -4x^2 - 8x + 32
\end{align}$$

Plugging this into the outer integral results in:

$$\begin{align}
m & = \int_0^2 \left(-4x^2 - 8x + 32\right) dx \\[1ex]
& = \left[-\frac{4}{3} x^3 - 4x^2 + 32x\right]_0^2
= \frac{112}{3}
\end{align}$$

Similarly are calculated both moments:

$$\begin{align}
M_y &= \iint_D x\,\rho(x,y)\,dx\,dy \\[1ex]
&= \int_{x=0}^2 \int_{y=x}^{4-x} x \left(2x + 3y + 2\right) dy\,dx
\end{align}$$

with the inner integral:

$$\begin{align}
\int_{y=x}^{4-x} x \left(2x + 3y + 2\right) dy
&= \left[2x^2 y + \frac{3x}{2} y^2 + 2xy\right]_{y=x}^{4-x} \\[1ex]
&= -4x^3-8x^2+32x
\end{align}$$

which makes:

$$\begin{align}
M_y & = \int_0^2 \left(-4x^3 - 8x^2 + 32x\right) dx \\[1ex]
& = \left[-x^4 - \frac{8}{3} x^3 + 16x^2\right]_0^2
= \frac{80}{3}
\end{align}$$

and

$$\begin{align}
M_x & = \iint_D y\,\rho(x,y)\,dx\,dy \\[1ex]
& = \int_{x=0}^2 \int_{y=x}^{4-x} y \left(2x + 3y + 2\right) dy\,dx \\[1ex]
& = \int_0^2 \left[xy^2 + y^3 + y^2\right]_{y=x}^{4-x} \, dx \\[1ex]
& = \int_0^2 \left(-2x^3 + 4x^2 - 40x + 80\right) dx \\[1ex]
& = \left[-\frac{x^4}{2}+\frac{4x^3}{3}-20x^2+80x\right]_0^2
= \frac{248}{3}
\end{align}$$

Finally, the center of mass is

$$\left( \frac{M_y}m, \frac{M_x}m \right) =
\left( \frac{\frac{80}{3}}{\frac{112}{3}}, \frac{\frac{248}{3}}{\frac{112}{3}} \right) =
\left( \frac{5}{7}, \frac{31}{14} \right)$$
