= Electromagnetic absorption by water =

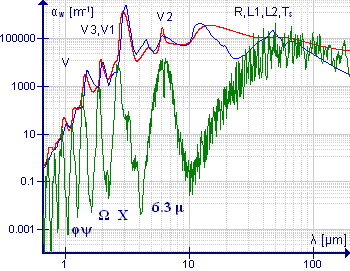
Absorption spectrum (attenuation coefficient vs. wavelength) of liquid water (red), atmospheric water vapor (green) and ice (blue line) between 667 nm and 200 μm. The plot for vapor is a transformation of data Synthetic spectrum for gas mixture 'Pure H_{2}O' (296K, 1 atm) retrieved from Hitran on the Web Information System.

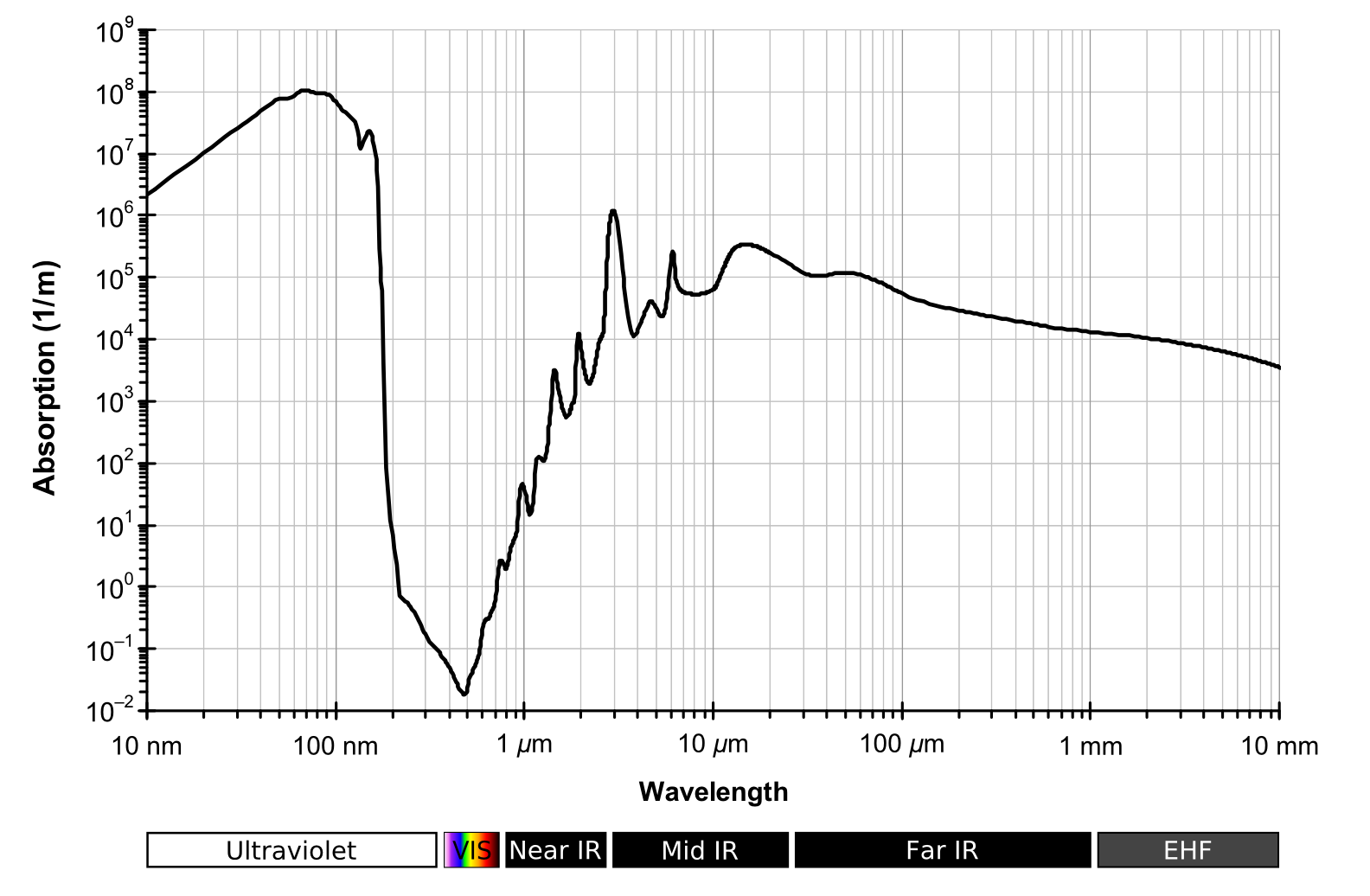
Liquid water absorption spectrum across a wide wavelength range

The absorption of electromagnetic radiation by water depends on the state of the water.

The absorption in the gas phase occurs in three regions of the spectrum. Rotational transitions are responsible for absorption in the microwave and far-infrared, vibrational transitions in the mid-infrared and near-infrared. Vibrational bands have rotational fine structure. Electronic transitions occur in the vacuum ultraviolet regions.

Its weak absorption in the visible spectrum results in the pale blue color of water.

== Overview ==
The water molecule in the gaseous state has three types of transition that can give rise to absorption of electromagnetic radiation:

- Rotational transitions, in which the molecule gains a quantum of rotational energy. Atmospheric water vapor at ambient temperature and pressure gives rise to absorption in the far-infrared region of the spectrum, from about 200 cm^{−1} (50 μm) to longer wavelengths towards the microwave region.
- Vibrational transitions in which a molecule gains a quantum of vibrational energy. The fundamental transitions give rise to absorption in the mid-infrared in the regions around 1650 cm^{−1} (μ band, 6 μm) and 3500 cm^{−1} (so-called X band, 2.9 μm)
- Electronic transitions in which a molecule is promoted to an excited electronic state. The lowest energy transition of this type is in the vacuum ultraviolet region.

In reality, vibrations of molecules in the gaseous state are accompanied by rotational transitions, giving rise to a vibration-rotation spectrum. Furthermore, vibrational overtones and combination bands occur in the near-infrared region. The HITRAN spectroscopy database lists more than 37,000 spectral lines for gaseous H_{2}^{16}O, ranging from the microwave region to the visible spectrum.

In liquid water the rotational transitions are effectively quenched, but absorption bands are affected by hydrogen bonding. In crystalline ice the vibrational spectrum is also affected by hydrogen bonding and there are lattice vibrations causing absorption in the far-infrared. Electronic transitions of gaseous molecules will show both vibrational and rotational fine structure.

=== Units ===
Infrared absorption band positions may be given either in wavelength (usually in micrometers, μm) or wavenumber (usually in reciprocal centimeters, cm^{−1}) scale.

== Rotational spectrum ==
Part of the pure rotation absorption spectrum of water vapour

Rotating water molecule

The water molecule is an asymmetric top; that is, it has three independent moments of inertia. Rotation about the 2-fold symmetry axis is illustrated at the left. Because of the low symmetry of the molecule, a large number of transitions can be observed in the far infrared region of the spectrum. Measurements of microwave spectra have provided a very precise value for the O−H bond length: 95.84 ± 0.05 pm and H−O−H bond angle, 104.5 ± 0.3°.

== Vibrational spectrum ==
The three fundamental vibrations of the water molecule

ν_{1}, O–H symmetric stretching
3657 cm^{−1} (2.734 μm)

ν_{2}, H–O–H bending
1595 cm^{−1} (6.269 μm)

ν_{3}, O–H asymmetric stretching
3756 cm^{−1} (2.662 μm)

The water molecule has three fundamental molecular vibrations. The O–H stretching vibrations give rise to absorption bands with band origins at 3657 cm^{−1} (ν_{1}, 2.734 μm) and 3756 cm^{−1} (ν_{3}, 2.662 μm) in the gas phase. The asymmetric stretching vibration, of B_{2} symmetry in the point group C_{2v}, is a normal vibration. The H–O–H bending mode origin is at 1595 cm^{−1} (ν_{2}, 6.269 μm). Both symmetric stretching and bending vibrations have A_{1} symmetry, but the frequency difference between them is so large that mixing is effectively zero. In the gas phase all three bands show extensive rotational fine structure. In the near-infrared spectrum, ν_{3} has a series of overtones at wavenumbers somewhat less than n·ν_{3}, n=2,3,4,5... Combination bands, such as ν_{2} + ν_{3}, are also easily observed in the near-infrared region. The presence of water vapor in the atmosphere is important for atmospheric chemistry especially as the infrared and near infrared spectra are easy to observe. Standard (atmospheric optical) codes are assigned to absorption bands as follows: 0.718 μm (visible): α, 0.810 μm: μ, 0.935 μm: ρστ, 1.13 μm: φ, 1.38 μm: ψ, 1.88 μm: Ω, 2.68 μm: X. The gaps between the bands define the infrared window in the Earth's atmosphere.

The infrared spectrum of liquid water is dominated by the intense absorption due to the fundamental O–H stretching vibrations. Because of the high intensity, very short path lengths of usually less than 50 μm are needed to record the spectra of aqueous solutions. There is no rotational fine structure, but the absorption bands are broader than might be expected because of hydrogen bonding. Peak maxima for liquid water are observed at 3450 cm^{−1} (2.898 μm), 3615 cm^{−1} (2.766 μm) and 1640 cm ^{−1} (6.097 μm). Direct measurement of the infrared spectra of aqueous solutions requires that the cuvette windows be made of substances such as calcium fluoride which are water-insoluble. This difficulty can alternatively be overcome by using an attenuated total reflectance (ATR) device rather than transmission.

In the near-infrared range liquid water has absorption bands around 1950 nm (5128 cm^{−1}), 1450 nm (6896 cm^{−1}), 1200 nm (8333 cm^{−1}) and 970 nm, (10300 cm^{−1}). The regions between these bands can be used in near-infrared spectroscopy to measure the spectra of aqueous solutions, with the advantage that glass is transparent in this region, so glass cuvettes can be used. The absorption intensity is weaker than for the fundamental vibrations, but this is not important as longer path-length cuvettes can be used. The absorption band at 698 nm (14300 cm^{−1}) is a 3rd overtone (n=4). It tails off onto the visible region and is responsible for the intrinsic blue color of water. This can be observed with a standard UV/vis spectrophotometer using a 10 cm path-length. The colour can be seen by eye by looking through a column of water about 10 m in length; the water must be passed through an ultrafilter to eliminate color due to Rayleigh scattering which also can make water appear blue.

The spectrum of ice is similar to that of liquid water, with peak maxima at 3400 cm^{−1} (2.941 μm), 3220 cm^{−1} (3.105 μm) and 1620 cm^{−1} (6.17 μm).

In both liquid water and ice clusters, low-frequency vibrations occur, which involve the stretching (TS) or bending (TB) of intermolecular hydrogen bonds (O–H•••O). Bands at wavelengths λ = 50–55 μm or 182–200 cm^{−1} (44 μm, 227 cm^{−1} in ice) have been attributed to TS, intermolecular stretch, and 200 μm or 50 cm^{−1} (166 μm, 60 cm^{−1} in ice), to TB, intermolecular bend.

== Visible region ==
Predicted wavelengths of overtones and combination bands of liquid water in the visible region
ν_{1}, ν_{3}	ν_{2}	wavelength /nm
4	0	742
4	1	662
5	0	605
5	1	550
6	0	514
6	1	474
7	0	449
7	1	418
8	0	401
8	1	376

Absorption coefficients for 200 nm and 900 nm are almost equal at 6.9 m^{−1} (attenuation length of 14.5 cm). Very weak light absorption in the visible region by liquid water has been measured using an integrating cavity absorption meter (ICAM). The absorption was attributed to a sequence of overtone and combination bands whose intensity decreases at each step, giving rise to an absolute minimum at 418 nm, at which wavelength the attenuation coefficient is about 0.0044 m^{−1}, which is an attenuation length of about 227 meters. These values correspond to pure absorption without scattering effects. The attenuation of, e.g., a laser beam would be slightly stronger.

Visible light absorption spectrum of pure water (absorption coefficient vs. wavelength)

== Electronic spectrum ==
The electronic transitions of the water molecule lie in the vacuum ultraviolet region. For water vapor the bands have been assigned as follows.

- 65 nm band — many different electronic transitions, photoionization, photodissociation
- discrete features between 115 and 180 nm
  - set of narrow bands between 115 and 125 nm
    Rydberg series: 1b_{1} (n_{2}) → many different Rydberg states and 3a_{1} (n_{1}) → 3sa_{1} Rydberg state
  - 128 nm band
    Rydberg series: 3a_{1} (n_{1}) → 3sa_{1} Rydberg state and 1b_{1} (n_{2}) → 3sa_{1} Rydberg state
  - 166.5 nm band
    1b_{1} (n_{2}) → 4a_{1} (σ_{1}*-like orbital)

== Microwaves and radio waves ==
Dielectric permittivity and dielectric loss of water between 0 °C and 100 °C, the arrows showing the effect of increasing temperature

The pure rotation spectrum of water vapor extends into the microwave region.

Liquid water has a broad absorption spectrum in the microwave region, which has been explained in terms of changes in the hydrogen bond network giving rise to a broad, featureless, microwave spectrum. The absorption (equivalent to dielectric loss) is used in microwave ovens to heat food that contains water molecules. A frequency of 2.45 GHz (wavelength 122 mm) is commonly used.

Radiocommunication at GHz frequencies is very difficult in fresh water and even more so in salt water.

== Atmospheric effects ==
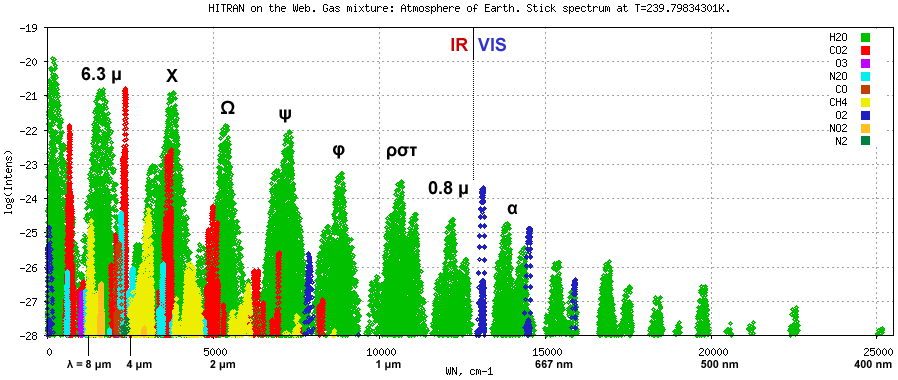
Synthetic stick absorption spectrum of a simple gas mixture corresponding to the Earth's atmosphere composition based on HITRAN data created using Hitran on the Web system. Green color – water vapor, WN – wavenumber (caution: lower wavelengths on the right, higher on the left). Water vapor concentration for this gas mixture is 0.4%.

Water vapor is a greenhouse gas in the Earth's atmosphere responsible for 70% of the known absorption of incoming sunlight, particularly in the infrared region where it absorbs 60% of the atmospheric absorption of thermal radiation emitted by the Earth in a process known as the greenhouse effect. It is also an important factor in multispectral imaging and hyperspectral imaging used in remote sensing because water vapor absorbs radiation differently in different spectral bands. Its effects are also an important consideration in infrared astronomy and radio astronomy in the microwave or millimeter wave bands. The South Pole Telescope was constructed in Antarctica in part because its high elevation and low temperatures mean there is very little water vapor in the atmosphere.

Similarly, carbon dioxide absorption bands occur around 1400, 1600 and 2000 nm, but its presence in the Earth's atmosphere accounts for just 26% of the greenhouse effect. Carbon dioxide gas absorbs energy in some small segments of the thermal infrared spectrum that water vapor misses. This extra absorption within the atmosphere causes the air to warm just a bit more and the warmer the atmosphere the greater its capacity to hold more water vapor. This extra water vapor absorption further enhances the Earth's greenhouse effect.

In the atmospheric window between approximately 8000 and 14000 nm, in the far-infrared spectrum, absorption by carbon dioxide and water is weak. This window allows most of the thermal radiation of these wavelengths to be radiated out to space directly from the Earth's surface. This band is also used for remote sensing of the Earth from space with for example thermal Infrared imaging.

As well as absorbing radiation, water vapour occasionally emits radiation in all directions, according to the black-body emission curve for its current temperature overlaid on the water absorption spectrum. Much of this energy will be recaptured by other water molecules, but at higher altitudes, radiation sent towards space is less likely to be recaptured since there is less water available to recapture radiation at water-specific absorbing wavelengths. By the top of the troposphere, about 12 km above sea level, most water vapor condenses to liquid water or ice as it releases its heat of vapourization. After changing phase, liquid water and ice fall away to lower altitudes. This loss will be balanced by incoming water vapour rising via convection currents.

Liquid water and ice emit radiation at a higher rate than water vapour (see graph above). Water at the top of the troposphere, particularly in liquid and solid states, cools as it emits net photons to space. Neighboring gas molecules other than water (e.g. nitrogen) are cooled by passing their heat kinetically to the water. This is why temperatures at the top of the troposphere (known as the tropopause) are about −50 degrees Celsius.

== See also ==
- Dielectric spectroscopy
- Differential optical absorption spectroscopy
- Hydroxyl ion absorption in optical fiber
- Water model
