= Selection rule =

Formal constraint in quantum mechanics

In physics and chemistry, a selection rule, or transition rule, formally constrains the possible transitions of a system from one quantum state to another. Selection rules have been derived for electromagnetic transitions in molecules, in atoms, in atomic nuclei, and so on. The selection rules may differ according to the technique used to observe the transition. The selection rule also plays a role in chemical reactions, where some are formally spin-forbidden reactions, that is, reactions where the spin state changes at least once from reactants to products.

In the following, mainly atomic and molecular transitions are considered.

== Overview ==
In quantum mechanics the basis for a spectroscopic selection rule is the value of the transition moment integral

$$m_{1,2} = \int \psi_1^* \, \mu \, \psi_2 \, \mathrm{d}\tau,$$

where $\psi_1$ and $\psi_2$ are the wave functions of the two states, "state 1" and "state 2", involved in the transition, and μ is the transition moment operator. This integral represents the propagator (and thus the probability) of the transition between states 1 and 2; if the value of this integral is zero then the transition is "forbidden".

In practice, to determine a selection rule the integral itself does not need to be calculated: It is sufficient to determine the symmetry of the transition moment function $\psi_1^* \, \mu \, \psi_2.$ If the transition moment function is symmetric over all of the totally symmetric representation of the point group to which the atom or molecule belongs, then the integral's value is (in general) not zero and the transition is allowed. Otherwise, the transition is "forbidden".

The transition moment integral is zero if the transition moment function, $\psi_1^* \, \mu \, \psi_2,$ is anti-symmetric or odd, i.e. $y(x) = -y(-x)$ holds. The symmetry of the transition moment function is the direct product of the parities of its three components. The symmetry characteristics of each component can be obtained from standard character tables. Rules for obtaining the symmetries of a direct product can be found in texts on character tables.

Symmetry characteristics of transition moment operator
Transition type	μ transforms as	Context
Electric dipole	x, y, z	Optical spectra
Electric quadrupole	x^{2}, y^{2}, z^{2}, xy, xz, yz	Constraint x^{2} + y^{2} + z^{2} = 0
Electric polarizability	x^{2}, y^{2}, z^{2}, xy, xz, yz	Raman spectra
Magnetic dipole	R_{x}, R_{y}, R_{z}	Optical spectra (weak)

== Examples ==
=== Electronic spectra ===
The Laporte rule is a selection rule formally stated as follows: In a centrosymmetric environment, transitions between like atomic orbitals such as s–s, p–p, d–d, or f–f, transitions are forbidden. The Laporte rule (law) applies to electric dipole transitions, so the operator has u symmetry (meaning ungerade, odd). p orbitals also have u symmetry, so the symmetry of the transition moment function is given by the product (formally, the product is taken in the group) u×u×u, which has u symmetry. The transitions are therefore forbidden. Likewise, d orbitals have g symmetry (meaning gerade, even), so the triple product g×u×g also has u symmetry and the transition is forbidden.

The wave function of a single electron is the product of a space-dependent wave function and a spin wave function. Spin is directional and can be said to have odd parity. It follows that transitions in which the spin "direction" changes are forbidden. In formal terms, only states with the same total spin quantum number are "spin-allowed". In crystal field theory, d–d transitions that are spin-forbidden are much weaker than spin-allowed transitions. Both can be observed, in spite of the Laporte rule, because the actual transitions are coupled to vibrations that are anti-symmetric and have the same symmetry as the dipole moment operator.

=== Vibrational spectra ===
In vibrational spectroscopy, transitions are observed between different vibrational states. In a fundamental vibration, the molecule is excited from its ground state (v = 0) to the first excited state (v = 1). The symmetry of the ground-state wave function is the same as that of the molecule. It is, therefore, a basis for the totally symmetric representation in the point group of the molecule. It follows that, for a vibrational transition to be allowed, the symmetry of the excited state wave function must be the same as the symmetry of the transition moment operator.

In infrared spectroscopy, the transition moment operator transforms as either x and/or y and/or z. The excited state wave function must also transform as at least one of these vectors. In Raman spectroscopy, the operator transforms as one of the second-order terms in the right-most column of the character table, below.

Character table for the T_{d} point group
	E	8 C_{3}	3 C_{2}	6 S_{4}	6 σ_{d}		
A_{1}	1	1	1	1	1		x^{2} + y^{2} + z^{2}
A_{2}	1	1	1	−1	−1		
E	2	−1	2	0	0		(2 z^{2} − x^{2} − y^{2}, x^{2} − y^{2})
T_{1}	3	0	−1	1	−1	(R_{x}, R_{y}, R_{z})	
T_{2}	3	0	−1	−1	1	(x, y, z)	(xy, xz, yz)

The molecule methane, CH_{4}, may be used as an example to illustrate the application of these principles. The molecule is tetrahedral and has T_{d} symmetry. The vibrations of methane span the representations A_{1} + E + 2T_{2}. Examination of the character table shows that all four vibrations are Raman-active, but only the T_{2} vibrations can be seen in the infrared spectrum.

In the harmonic approximation, it can be shown that overtones are forbidden in both infrared and Raman spectra. However, when anharmonicity is taken into account, the transitions are weakly allowed.

In Raman and infrared spectroscopy, the selection rules predict certain vibrational modes to have zero intensities in the Raman and/or the IR. Displacements from the ideal structure can result in relaxation of the selection rules and appearance of these unexpected phonon modes in the spectra. Therefore, the appearance of new modes in the spectra can be a useful indicator of symmetry breakdown.

=== Rotational spectra ===
The selection rule for rotational transitions, derived from the symmetries of the rotational wave functions in a rigid rotor, is ΔJ = ±1, where J is a rotational quantum number.

=== Coupled transitions ===
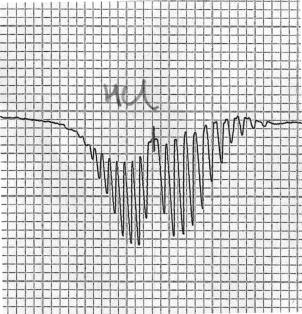
The infrared spectrum of HCl gas

There are many types of coupled transition such as are observed in vibration–rotation spectra. The excited-state wave function is the product of two wave functions such as vibrational and rotational. The general principle is that the symmetry of the excited state is obtained as the direct product of the symmetries of the component wave functions. In rovibronic transitions, the excited states involve three wave functions.

The infrared spectrum of hydrogen chloride gas shows rotational fine structure superimposed on the vibrational spectrum. This is typical of the infrared spectra of heteronuclear diatomic molecules. It shows the so-called P and R branches. The Q branch, located at the vibration frequency, is absent. Symmetric top molecules display the Q branch. This follows from the application of selection rules.

Resonance Raman spectroscopy involves a kind of vibronic coupling. It results in much-increased intensity of fundamental and overtone transitions as the vibrations "steal" intensity from an allowed electronic transition. In spite of appearances, the selection rules are the same as in Raman spectroscopy.

=== Angular momentum ===
In general, electric (charge) radiation or magnetic (current, magnetic moment) radiation can be classified into multipoles Eλ (electric) or Mλ (magnetic) of order 2^{λ}, e.g., E1 for electric dipole, E2 for quadrupole, or E3 for octupole. In transitions where the change in angular momentum between the initial and final states makes several multipole radiations possible, usually the lowest-order multipoles are overwhelmingly more likely, and dominate the transition.

The emitted particle carries away angular momentum, with quantum number λ, which for the photon must be at least 1, since it is a vector particle (i.e., it has J^{P} = 1^{−}). Thus, there is no radiation from E0 (electric monopoles) or M0 (magnetic monopoles, which do not seem to exist).

Since the total angular momentum has to be conserved during the transition, we have that

$$\mathbf J_\text{i} = \mathbf{J}_\text{f} + \boldsymbol{\lambda},$$

where $\|\boldsymbol{\lambda}\| = \sqrt{\lambda(\lambda + 1)} \, \hbar,$ and its z projection is given by $\lambda_z = \mu \hbar;$ and where $\mathbf J_\text{i}$ and $\mathbf J_\text{f}$ are, respectively, the initial and final angular momenta of the atom. The corresponding quantum numbers λ and μ (z-axis angular momentum) must satisfy

$$|J_\text{i} - J_\text{f}| \le \lambda \le J_\text{i} + J_\text{f}$$

and

$$\mu = M_\text{i} - M_\text{f}.$$

Parity is also preserved. For electric multipole transitions

$$\pi(\mathrm{E}\lambda) = \pi_\text{i} \pi_\text{f} = (-1)^{\lambda},$$

while for magnetic multipoles

$$\pi(\mathrm{M}\lambda) = \pi_\text{i} \pi_\text{f} = (-1)^{\lambda+1}.$$

Thus, parity does not change for E-even or M-odd multipoles, while it changes for E-odd or M-even multipoles.

These considerations generate different sets of transitions rules depending on the multipole order and type. The expression forbidden transitions is often used, but this does not mean that these transitions cannot occur, only that they are electric-dipole-forbidden. These transitions are perfectly possible; they merely occur at a lower rate. If the rate for an E1 transition is non-zero, the transition is said to be permitted; if it is zero, then M1, E2, etc. transitions can still produce radiation, albeit with much lower transitions rates. The transition rate decreases by a factor of about 1000 from one multipole to the next one, so the lowest multipole transitions are most likely to occur.

Semi-forbidden transitions (resulting in so-called intercombination lines) are electric dipole (E1) transitions for which the selection rule that the spin does not change is violated. This is a result of the failure of LS coupling.

==== Summary table ====
$J = L + S$ is the total angular momentum, $L$ is the azimuthal quantum number, $S$ is the spin quantum number, and $M_J$ is the secondary total angular momentum quantum number. Which transitions are allowed is based on the hydrogen-like atom. The symbol $\not\leftrightarrow$ is used to indicate a forbidden transition.

Allowed transitions		Electric dipole (E1)	Magnetic dipole (M1)	Electric quadrupole (E2)	Magnetic quadrupole (M2)	Electric octupole (E3)	Magnetic octupole (M3)
Rigorous rules	(1)	$$\begin{matrix} \Delta J = 0, \pm 1 \\ (J = 0 \not \leftrightarrow 0)\end{matrix}$$		$$\begin{matrix} \Delta J = 0, \pm 1, \pm 2 \\ (J = 0 \not \leftrightarrow 0, 1;\ \begin{matrix}{1 \over 2}\end{matrix} \not \leftrightarrow \begin{matrix}{1 \over 2}\end{matrix})\end{matrix}$$		$$\begin{matrix}\Delta J = 0, \pm1, \pm2, \pm 3 \\ (0 \not \leftrightarrow 0, 1, 2;\ \begin{matrix}{1 \over 2}\end{matrix} \not \leftrightarrow \begin{matrix}{1 \over 2} \end{matrix}, \begin{matrix}{3 \over 2}\end{matrix};\ 1 \not \leftrightarrow 1) \end{matrix}$$	
Rigorous rules	(2)	$\Delta M_J = 0, \pm 1 \ (M_J = 0 \not \leftrightarrow 0$ if $\Delta J=0)$		$\Delta M_J = 0, \pm 1, \pm2$		$\Delta M_J = 0, \pm 1, \pm2, \pm 3$	
Rigorous rules	(3)	$\pi_\text{f} = -\pi_\text{i}$	$\pi_\text{f} = \pi_\text{i}$		$\pi_\text{f} = -\pi_\text{i}$		$\pi_\text{f} = \pi_\text{i}$
LS coupling	(4)	One-electron jump $\Delta L = \pm 1$	No electron jump $\Delta L = 0$, $\Delta n = 0$	None or one-electron jump $\Delta L = 0, \pm 2$	One-electron jump $\Delta L = \pm 1$	One-electron jump $\Delta L = \pm 1, \pm 3$	One-electron jump $\Delta L = 0, \pm 2$
LS coupling	(5)	If $\Delta S = 0$: $$\begin{matrix}\Delta L = 0, \pm 1 \\ (L = 0 \not \leftrightarrow 0)\end{matrix}$$	If $\Delta S = 0$: $\Delta L = 0\,$	If $\Delta S = 0$: $$\begin{matrix}\Delta L = 0, \pm 1, \pm 2 \\ (L = 0 \not \leftrightarrow 0, 1)\end{matrix}$$		If $\Delta S = 0$: $$\begin{matrix}\Delta L = 0, \pm 1, \pm 2, \pm 3 \\ (L=0 \not \leftrightarrow 0, 1, 2;\ 1 \not \leftrightarrow 1)\end{matrix}$$	
Intermediate coupling	(6)	If $\Delta S = \pm 1$: $\Delta L = 0, \pm 1, \pm 2\,$		If $\Delta S = \pm 1$: $$\begin{matrix}\Delta L = 0, \pm 1, \\ \pm 2, \pm 3 \\ (L = 0 \not \leftrightarrow 0)\end{matrix}$$	If $\Delta S = \pm 1$: $$\begin{matrix}\Delta L = 0, \pm 1 \\ (L = 0 \not \leftrightarrow 0)\end{matrix}$$	If $\Delta S = \pm 1$: $$\begin{matrix}\Delta L = 0, \pm 1, \\ \pm 2, \pm 3, \pm 4 \\ (L = 0 \not \leftrightarrow 0, 1)\end{matrix}$$	If $\Delta S = \pm 1$: $$\begin{matrix}\Delta L = 0, \pm 1, \\ \pm 2 \\ (L = 0 \not \leftrightarrow 0)\end{matrix}$$

In hyperfine structure, the total angular momentum of the atom is $F = I + J,$ where $I$ is the nuclear spin angular momentum and $J$ is the total angular momentum of the electron(s). Since $F = I + J$ has a similar mathematical form as $J = L + S,$ it obeys a selection rule table similar to the table above.

=== Surface ===
In surface vibrational spectroscopy, the surface selection rule is applied to identify the peaks observed in vibrational spectra. When a molecule is adsorbed on a substrate, the molecule induces opposite image charges in the substrate. The dipole moment of the molecule and the image charges perpendicular to the surface reinforce each other. In contrast, the dipole moments of the molecule and the image charges parallel to the surface cancel out. Therefore, only molecular vibrational peaks giving rise to a dynamic dipole moment perpendicular to the surface will be observed in the vibrational spectrum.

== See also ==
- Superselection rule
- Spin-forbidden reactions
- Singlet fission
