= Rigid rotor =

Model of rotating physical systems

In rotordynamics, the rigid rotor is a mechanical model of rotating systems. An arbitrary rigid rotor is a 3-dimensional rigid object, such as a top. To orient such an object in space requires three angles, known as Euler angles (ψ, θ, φ). A special rigid rotor is the linear rotor requiring only two angles to describe, for example a diatomic molecule such as HI, HCl, CO. More general molecules are 3-dimensional, such as water (asymmetric rotor), ammonia (symmetric rotor), or methane (spherical rotor).

== Linear rotor ==
The linear rigid rotor model consists of two point masses located at fixed distances from their center of mass. The fixed distance between the two masses and the values of the masses are the only characteristics of the rigid model. However, for many actual diatomic molecules this model is too restrictive since distances are usually not fixed. Corrections on the rigid model can be made to compensate for small variations in the distance. Even in such a case the rigid rotor model is a useful point of departure (zeroth-order model).

=== Classical linear rigid rotor ===
The classical linear rotor consists of two point masses $m_1$ and $m_2$ (with reduced mass $\mu = \frac{m_1 m_2}{m_1 + m_2}$) at a distance $R$ of each other. The rotor is rigid if $R$ is independent of time. The kinematics of a linear rigid rotor is usually described by means of spherical polar coordinates ($\theta, \varphi, R$ ), which form a coordinate system of R^{3}. In the physics convention the coordinates are the co-latitude (zenith) angle $\theta \,$, the longitudinal (azimuth) angle $\varphi\,$ and the distance $R$. The angles specify the orientation of the rotor in space. The kinetic energy $T$ of the linear rigid rotor is given by
$$\begin{align}
2T &= \mu R^2 \left[\dot{\theta}^2 + (\dot\varphi\,\sin\theta)^2\right] \\[1ex]
&=
\mu R^2 \begin{pmatrix} \dot{\theta} & \dot{\varphi} \end{pmatrix}
\begin{pmatrix}
1 & 0 \\
0 & \sin^2\theta \\
\end{pmatrix}
\begin{pmatrix} \dot{\theta} \\ \dot{\varphi} \end{pmatrix} \\[1ex]
&=
\mu \begin{pmatrix}\dot{\theta} & \dot{\varphi}\end{pmatrix}
\begin{pmatrix}
h_\theta^2 & 0 \\
0 & h_\varphi^2 \\
\end{pmatrix}
\begin{pmatrix}\dot{\theta} \\ \dot{\varphi}\end{pmatrix},
\end{align}$$

where $h_\theta = R\,$ and $h_\varphi= R\sin\theta\,$ are scale (or Lamé) factors.

Scale factors are of importance for quantum mechanical applications since they enter the Laplacian expressed in curvilinear coordinates. In the case at hand (constant $R$)
$$\begin{align}
\nabla^2 &= \frac{1}{h_\theta h_\varphi}\left[
\frac{\partial}{\partial \theta} \frac{h_\varphi}{h_\theta} \frac{\partial}{\partial \theta}
+ \frac{\partial}{\partial \varphi} \frac{h_\theta}{h_\varphi} \frac{\partial}{\partial \varphi}
\right] \\
&=
\frac{1}{R^2}\left[
\frac{1}{\sin\theta}\frac{\partial}{\partial\theta}
\sin\theta\frac{\partial}{\partial\theta}
+ \frac{1}{\sin^2\theta}\frac{\partial^2}{\partial\varphi^2}
\right].
\end{align}$$

The classical Hamiltonian function of the linear rigid rotor is
$$H = \frac{1}{2\mu R^2}\left[p^2_{\theta} + \frac{p^2_{\varphi}}{\sin^2\theta}\right].$$

=== Quantum mechanical linear rigid rotor ===
The linear rigid rotor model can be used in quantum mechanics to predict the rotational energy of a diatomic molecule. The rotational energy depends on the moment of inertia for the system, $I$. In the center of mass reference frame, the moment of inertia is equal to:

$$I = \mu R^2$$

where $\mu$ is the reduced mass of the molecule and $R$ is the distance between the two atoms.

According to quantum mechanics, the energy levels of a system can be determined by solving the Schrödinger equation:

$$\hat H \Psi = E \Psi$$

where $\Psi$ is the wave function and $\hat H$ is the energy (Hamiltonian) operator. For the rigid rotor in a field-free space, the energy operator corresponds to the kinetic energy of the system:

$$\hat H = - \frac{\hbar^2}{2\mu} \nabla^2$$

where $\hbar$ is reduced Planck constant ($h\over2\pi$) and $\nabla^2$ (del squared) is the Laplacian. The Laplacian is given above in terms of spherical polar coordinates. The energy operator written in terms of these coordinates is:

$$\hat H =- \frac{\hbar^2}{2I} \left [ {1 \over \sin \theta} {\partial \over \partial \theta} \left ( \sin \theta {\partial \over \partial \theta} \right) + {1 \over {\sin^2 \theta}} {\partial^2 \over \partial \varphi^2} \right]$$

This operator appears also in the Schrödinger equation of the hydrogen atom after the radial part is separated off. The eigenvalue equation becomes
$$\hat H Y_\ell^m(\theta, \varphi) = \frac{\hbar^2}{2I} \ell(\ell+1) \, Y_\ell^m(\theta, \varphi).$$
The symbol $Y_\ell^m (\theta, \varphi)$ represents a set of functions known as the spherical harmonics. Note that the energy does depend on $m \,$through $\ce{\ell}$. The energy
$$E_\ell = {\hbar^2 \over 2I} \ell \left (\ell+1\right)$$
is $2\ell+1$-fold degenerate: the functions with fixed $\ell$ and $m=-\ell,-\ell+1,\dots,\ell$ have the same energy.

Introducing the rotational constant $B$, we write,
$$E_\ell = B\; \ell \left (\ell+1\right)\quad
\textrm{with}\quad B \equiv \frac{\hbar^2}{2I}.$$
In the units of reciprocal length the rotational constant is,
$$\bar B \equiv \frac{B}{hc} = \frac{h}{8\pi^2cI} = \frac{\hbar}{4\pi c \mu R_e^2},$$
with c being the speed of light. If cgs units are used for $h$, $c$, and $I$, $\bar B$ is expressed in cm^{−1}, or wave numbers, which is a unit that is often used for rotational-vibrational spectroscopy. The rotational constant $\bar B(R)$ depends on the distance $R$. Often one writes $B_e = \bar B(R_e)$ where $R_e$ is the equilibrium value of $R$ (the value for which the interaction energy of the atoms in the rotor has a minimum).

A typical rotational absorption spectrum consists of a series of peaks that correspond to transitions between levels with different values of the angular momentum quantum number ($\ell$) such that $\Delta l = +1$, due to the selection rules (see below). Consequently, rotational peaks appear at energies with differences corresponding to an integer multiple of $2\bar B$.

=== Selection rules ===
Rotational transitions of a molecule occur when the molecule absorbs a photon [a particle of a quantized electromagnetic (em) field]. Depending on the energy of the photon (i.e., the wavelength of the em field) this transition may be seen as a sideband of a vibrational and/or electronic transition. Pure rotational transitions, in which the vibronic (vibrational and electronic) wave function does not change, occur in the microwave region of the electromagnetic spectrum.

Typically, rotational transitions can only be observed when the angular momentum quantum number changes by $1$ $(\Delta l = \pm 1)$. This selection rule arises from a first-order perturbation theory approximation of the time-dependent Schrödinger equation. According to this treatment, rotational transitions can only be observed when one or more components of the dipole operator have a non-vanishing transition moment. If $z$ is the direction of the electric field component of the incoming electromagnetic wave, the transition moment is,
$$\langle \psi_2 | \mu_z | \psi_1\rangle =
\left ( \mu_z \right )_{21} = \int \psi_2^*\mu_z\psi_1\, \mathrm{d}\tau .$$

A transition occurs if this integral is non-zero. By separating the rotational part of the molecular wavefunction from the vibronic part, one can show that this means that the molecule must have a permanent dipole moment. After integration over the vibronic coordinates the following rotational part of the transition moment remains,

$$\left ( \mu_z \right )_{l,m;l',m'} = \mu \int_0^{2\pi} \mathrm{d}\phi \int_{-1}^1 Y_{l'}^{m'}{\!\left( \theta , \phi \right )}^* \cos \theta\; Y_l^m{\!\left ( \theta , \phi \right )}\; \mathrm{d}(\cos\theta).$$
Here $\mu \cos\theta \,$ is the z component of the permanent dipole moment. The moment $\mu$ is the vibronically averaged component of the dipole operator. Only the component of the permanent dipole along the axis of a heteronuclear molecule is non-vanishing. By the use of the orthogonality of the spherical harmonics $Y_l^m\, \left ( \theta , \phi \right )$ it is possible to determine which values of $l$, $m$, $l'$, and $m'$ will result in nonzero values for the dipole transition moment integral. This constraint results in the observed selection rules for the rigid rotor:

$$\Delta m = 0  \quad\hbox{and}\quad  \Delta l = \pm 1$$

=== Non-rigid linear rotor ===
The rigid rotor is commonly used to describe the rotational energy of diatomic molecules, but it is not a completely accurate description of such molecules. This is because molecular bonds (and therefore the interatomic distance $R$) are not completely fixed; the bond between the atoms stretches out as the molecule rotates faster (higher values of the rotational quantum number $l$). This effect can be accounted for by introducing a correction factor known as the centrifugal distortion constant $\bar{D}$ (bars on top of various quantities indicate that these quantities are expressed in cm^{−1}):

$$\bar E_l = {E_l \over hc} = \bar {B}l \left (l+1\right ) - \bar {D}l^2 \left (l+1\right )^2$$

where

- $\bar D = {4 \bar {B}^3 \over \bar{\boldsymbol\omega}^2}$
- $\bar{\boldsymbol\omega}$ is the fundamental vibrational frequency of the bond (in cm^{−1}). This frequency is related to the reduced mass and the force constant (bond strength) of the molecule according to
  $$\bar{\boldsymbol\omega} = {1\over 2\pi c} \sqrt{k \over \mu }$$

The non-rigid rotor is an acceptably accurate model for diatomic molecules, but is still somewhat imperfect. This is because, although the model does account for bond stretching due to rotation, it ignores any bond stretching due to vibrational energy in the bond (anharmonicity in the potential).

== Arbitrarily shaped rigid rotor ==
An arbitrarily shaped rigid rotor is a rigid body of arbitrary shape with its center of mass fixed (or in uniform rectilinear motion) in field-free space R^{3}, so that its energy consists only of rotational kinetic energy (and possibly constant translational energy that can be ignored). A rigid body can be (partially) characterized by the three eigenvalues of its moment of inertia tensor, which are real nonnegative values known as principal moments of inertia. In microwave spectroscopy—the spectroscopy based on rotational transitions—one usually classifies molecules (seen as rigid rotors) as follows:

- spherical rotors
- symmetric rotors
  - oblate symmetric rotors
  - prolate symmetric rotors
- asymmetric rotors

This classification depends on the relative magnitudes of the principal moments of inertia.

=== Coordinates of the rigid rotor ===
Different branches of physics and engineering use different coordinates for the description of the kinematics of a rigid rotor. In molecular physics Euler angles are used almost exclusively. In quantum mechanical applications it is advantageous to use Euler angles in a convention that is a simple extension of the physical convention of spherical polar coordinates.

The first step is the attachment of a right-handed orthonormal frame (3-dimensional system of orthogonal axes) to the rotor (a body-fixed frame). This frame can be attached arbitrarily to the body, but often one uses the principal axes frame—the normalized eigenvectors of the inertia tensor, which always can be chosen orthonormal, since the tensor is symmetric. When the rotor possesses a symmetry-axis, it usually coincides with one of the principal axes. It is convenient to choose as body-fixed z-axis the highest-order symmetry axis.

One starts by aligning the body-fixed frame with a space-fixed frame (laboratory axes), so that the body-fixed x, y, and z axes coincide with the space-fixed X, Y, and Z axis. Secondly, the body and its frame are rotated actively over a positive angle $\alpha\,$ around the z-axis (by the right-hand rule), which moves the $y$- to the $y'$-axis. Thirdly, one rotates the body and its frame over a positive angle $\beta\,$ around the $y'$-axis. The z-axis of the body-fixed frame has after these two rotations the longitudinal angle $\alpha \,$ (commonly designated by $\varphi\,$) and the colatitude angle $\beta\,$ (commonly designated by $\theta\,$), both with respect to the space-fixed frame. If the rotor were cylindrical symmetric around its z-axis, like the linear rigid rotor, its orientation in space would be unambiguously specified at this point.

If the body lacks cylinder (axial) symmetry, a last rotation around its z-axis (which has polar coordinates $\beta\,$ and $\alpha\,$) is necessary to specify its orientation completely. Traditionally the last rotation angle is called $\gamma\,$.

The convention for Euler angles described here is known as the $z''-y'-z$ convention; it can be shown (in the same manner as in this article) that it is equivalent to the $z-y-z$ convention in which the order of rotations is reversed.

The total matrix of the three consecutive rotations is the product

$$\mathbf{R}(\alpha,\beta,\gamma)=
\begin{pmatrix}
\cos\alpha & -\sin\alpha & 0 \\
\sin\alpha & \cos\alpha  & 0 \\
0      &      0      & 1
\end{pmatrix}
\begin{pmatrix}
\cos\beta  &   0  & \sin\beta \\
0     &   1  &         0 \\
-\sin\beta &   0  & \cos\beta \\
\end{pmatrix}
\begin{pmatrix}
\cos\gamma & -\sin\gamma & 0 \\
\sin\gamma & \cos\gamma  & 0 \\
0      &      0      & 1
\end{pmatrix}$$

Let $\mathbf{r}(0)$ be the coordinate vector of an arbitrary point $\mathcal{P}$ in the body with respect to the body-fixed frame. The elements of $\mathbf{r}(0)$ are the 'body-fixed coordinates' of $\mathcal{P}$. Initially $\mathbf{r}(0)$ is also the space-fixed coordinate vector of $\mathcal{P}$. Upon rotation of the body, the body-fixed coordinates of $\mathcal{P}$ do not change, but the space-fixed coordinate vector of $\mathcal{P}$ becomes,
$$\mathbf{r}(\alpha,\beta,\gamma)= \mathbf{R}(\alpha,\beta,\gamma)\mathbf{r}(0).$$
In particular, if $\mathcal{P}$ is initially on the space-fixed Z-axis, it has the space-fixed coordinates
$$\mathbf{R}(\alpha,\beta,\gamma)
\begin{pmatrix}
0 \\
0 \\
r \\
\end{pmatrix}=
\begin{pmatrix}
r \cos\alpha\sin\beta \\
r \sin\alpha \sin\beta \\
r \cos\beta \\
\end{pmatrix},$$
which shows the correspondence with the spherical polar coordinates (in the physical convention).

Knowledge of the Euler angles as function of time t and the initial coordinates $\mathbf{r}(0)$ determine the kinematics of the rigid rotor.

=== Classical Kinetic Energy ===
The following text forms a generalization of the well-known special case of the rotational energy of an object that rotates around one axis.

It will be assumed from here on that the body-fixed frame is a principal axes frame; it diagonalizes the instantaneous inertia tensor $\mathbf{I}(t)$ (expressed with respect to the space-fixed frame), i.e.,
$$\mathbf{R}(\alpha,\beta,\gamma)^{-1}\; \mathbf{I}(t)\; \mathbf{R}(\alpha,\beta,\gamma)
= \mathbf{I}(0)\quad\hbox{with}\quad
\mathbf{I}(0) =
\begin{pmatrix}
I_1 & 0 & 0 \\ 0 & I_2 & 0 \\ 0 & 0 & I_3 \\
\end{pmatrix},$$
where the Euler angles are time-dependent and in fact determine the time dependence of $\mathbf{I}(t)$ by the inverse of this equation. This notation implies that at $t=0$ the Euler angles are zero, so that at $t=0$ the body-fixed frame coincides with the space-fixed frame.

The classical kinetic energy T of the rigid rotor can be expressed in different ways:

- as a function of angular velocity
- in Lagrangian form
- as a function of angular momentum
- in Hamiltonian form.

Since each of these forms has its use and can be found in textbooks we will present all of them.

==== Angular velocity form ====
As a function of angular velocity T reads,
$$T = \tfrac{1}{2} \left[ I_1 \omega_x^2 + I_2 \omega_y^2+ I_3 \omega_z^2 \right]$$
with
$$\begin{pmatrix}
\omega_x \\
\omega_y \\
\omega_z \\
\end{pmatrix}
=
\begin{pmatrix}
-\sin\beta\cos\gamma & \sin\gamma & 0 \\
\sin\beta\sin\gamma & \cos\gamma & 0 \\
\cos\beta        &        0   & 1 \\
\end{pmatrix}
\begin{pmatrix}
\dot{\alpha} \\
\dot{\beta} \\
\dot{\gamma} \\
\end{pmatrix}.$$

The vector $\boldsymbol{\omega} = (\omega_x, \omega_y, \omega_z)$ on the left hand side contains the components of the angular velocity of the rotor expressed with respect to the body-fixed frame. The angular velocity satisfies equations of motion known as Euler's equations (with zero applied torque, since by assumption the rotor is in field-free space). It can be shown that $\boldsymbol{\omega}$ is not the time derivative of any vector, in contrast to the usual definition of velocity.

The dots over the time-dependent Euler angles on the right hand side indicate time derivatives. Note that a different rotation matrix would result from a different choice of Euler angle convention used.

==== Lagrange form ====
Back substitution of the expression of $\boldsymbol{\omega}$ into T gives the kinetic energy in Lagrange form (as a function of the time derivatives of the Euler angles). In matrix-vector notation,
$$2 T =
\begin{pmatrix}
\dot{\alpha} & \dot{\beta} & \dot{\gamma}
\end{pmatrix}
\; \mathbf{g} \;
\begin{pmatrix}
\dot{\alpha} \\ \dot{\beta} \\ \dot{\gamma}\\
\end{pmatrix},$$
where $\mathbf{g}$ is the metric tensor expressed in Euler angles—a non-orthogonal system of curvilinear coordinates—

$$\mathbf{g}=
\begin{pmatrix}
I_1 \sin^2\beta \cos^2\gamma+I_2\sin^2\beta\sin^2\gamma+I_3\cos^2\beta &
(I_2-I_1) \sin\beta\sin\gamma\cos\gamma &
I_3\cos\beta \\
(I_2-I_1) \sin\beta\sin\gamma\cos\gamma &
I_1\sin^2\gamma+I_2\cos^2\gamma & 0 \\
I_3\cos\beta & 0 & I_3 \\
\end{pmatrix}.$$

==== Angular momentum form ====
Often the kinetic energy is written as a function of the angular momentum $\mathbf{L}$ of the rigid rotor. With respect to the body-fixed frame it has the components $L_i$, and can be shown to be related to the angular velocity,
$$\mathbf{L} =
\mathbf{I}(0)\;
\boldsymbol{\omega}\quad\hbox{or}\quad L_i = \frac{\partial T}{\partial\omega_i},\;\; i=x,\,y,\,z.$$
This angular momentum is a conserved (time-independent) quantity if viewed from a stationary space-fixed frame. Since the body-fixed frame moves (depends on time) the components $L_i$ are not time independent. If we were to represent $\mathbf{L}$ with respect to the stationary space-fixed frame, we would find time independent expressions for its components.

The kinetic energy is expressed in terms of the angular momentum by
$$T = \frac{1}{2} \left[ \frac{L_x^2}{I_1} + \frac{L_y^2}{I_2}+ \frac{L_z^2}{I_3}\right].$$

==== Hamilton form ====
The Hamilton form of the kinetic energy is written in terms of generalized momenta
$$\begin{pmatrix}
p_\alpha \\
p_\beta \\
p_\gamma \\
\end{pmatrix}
\mathrel\stackrel{\mathrm{def}}{=}
\begin{pmatrix}
\partial T/{\partial \dot{\alpha}}\\
\partial T/{\partial \dot{\beta}} \\
\partial T/{\partial \dot{\gamma}} \\
\end{pmatrix}
= \mathbf{g}
\begin{pmatrix} \; \,
\dot{\alpha} \\ \dot{\beta} \\ \dot{\gamma}\\
\end{pmatrix},$$
where it is used that the $\mathbf{g}$ is symmetric. In Hamilton form the kinetic energy is,
$$2 T =
\begin{pmatrix}
p_{\alpha} & p_{\beta} & p_{\gamma}
\end{pmatrix}
\; \mathbf{g}^{-1} \;
\begin{pmatrix}
p_{\alpha} \\ p_{\beta} \\ p_{\gamma}\\
\end{pmatrix},$$
with the inverse metric tensor given by
$$\sin^2\beta\; \mathbf{g}^{-1} =
\begin{pmatrix}
\frac{1}{I_1}\cos^2\gamma + \frac{1}{I_2}\sin^2\gamma &
\left(\frac{1}{I_2} - \frac{1}{I_1}\right)\sin\beta\sin\gamma\cos\gamma &
-\frac{1}{I_1}\cos\beta\cos^2\gamma - \frac{1}{I_2}\cos\beta\sin^2\gamma \\
\left(\frac{1}{I_2} - \frac{1}{I_1}\right)\sin\beta\sin\gamma\cos\gamma &
\frac{1}{I_1}\sin^2\beta\sin^2\gamma + \frac{1}{I_2}\sin^2\beta\cos^2\gamma &
\left(\frac{1}{I_1} - \frac{1}{I_2}\right)\sin\beta\cos\beta\sin\gamma\cos\gamma \\
-\frac{1}{I_1}\cos\beta\cos^2\gamma - \frac{1}{I_2}\cos\beta\sin^2\gamma &
\left(\frac{1}{I_1} - \frac{1}{I_2}\right)\sin\beta\cos\beta\sin\gamma\cos\gamma &
\frac{1}{I_1}\cos^2\beta\cos^2\gamma + \frac{1}{I_2}\cos^2\beta\sin^2\gamma + \frac{1}{I_3}\sin^2\beta \\
\end{pmatrix}.$$

This inverse tensor is needed to obtain the Laplace-Beltrami operator, which (multiplied by $-\hbar^2$) gives the quantum mechanical energy operator of the rigid rotor.

The classical Hamiltonian given above can be rewritten to the following expression, which is needed in the phase integral arising in the classical statistical mechanics of rigid rotors,
$$\begin{align}
T ={} &\frac{1}{2I_1 \sin^2\beta}
\left( \left(p_\alpha - p_\gamma\cos\beta\right) \cos\gamma -
p_\beta\sin\beta\sin\gamma \right)^2 +{} \\
&\frac{1}{2I_2 \sin^2\beta}
\left( \left(p_\alpha - p_\gamma\cos\beta\right) \sin\gamma +
p_\beta\sin\beta\cos\gamma \right)^2 + \frac{p_\gamma^2}{2I_3}. \\
\end{align}$$

=== Quantum mechanical rigid rotor ===
As usual quantization is performed by the replacement of the generalized momenta by operators that give first derivatives with respect to its canonically conjugate variables (positions). Thus,
$$p_\alpha \longrightarrow -i \hbar \frac{\partial}{\partial \alpha}$$
and similarly for $p_\beta$ and $p_\gamma$. It is remarkable that this rule replaces the fairly complicated function $p_\alpha$ of all three Euler angles, time derivatives of Euler angles, and inertia moments (characterizing the rigid rotor) by a simple differential operator that does not depend on time or inertia moments and differentiates to one Euler angle only.

The quantization rule is sufficient to obtain the operators that correspond with the classical angular momenta. There are two kinds: space-fixed and body-fixed angular momentum operators. Both are vector operators, i.e., both have three components that transform as vector components among themselves upon rotation of the space-fixed and the body-fixed frame, respectively. The explicit form of the rigid rotor angular momentum operators is given here (but beware, they must be multiplied with $\hbar$). The body-fixed angular momentum operators are written as $\hat{\mathcal{P}}_i$. They satisfy anomalous commutation relations.

The quantization rule is not sufficient to obtain the kinetic energy operator from the classical Hamiltonian. Since classically $p_\beta$ commutes with $\cos\beta$ and $\sin\beta$ and the inverses of these functions, the position of these trigonometric functions in the classical Hamiltonian is arbitrary. After quantization the commutation does no longer hold and the order of operators and functions in the Hamiltonian (energy operator) becomes a point of concern. Podolsky proposed in 1928 that the Laplace-Beltrami operator (times $-\tfrac{1}{2}\hbar^2$) has the appropriate form for the quantum mechanical kinetic energy operator. This operator has the general form (summation convention: sum over repeated indices—in this case over the three Euler angles $q^1,\,q^2,\,q^3 \equiv \alpha,\,\beta,\,\gamma$):

$$\hat{H} = - \frac{\hbar^2}{2}\;|g|^{-\frac{1}{2}}
\frac{\partial}{\partial q^i} |g|^\frac{1}{2} g^{ij} \frac{\partial}{\partial q^j},$$
where $|g|$ is the determinant of the g-tensor:
$$|g| = I_1\, I_2\, I_3\, \sin^2\beta \quad \hbox{and}\quad g^{ij} = \left(\mathbf{g}^{-1}\right)_{ij}.$$
Given the inverse of the metric tensor above, the explicit form of the kinetic energy operator in terms of Euler angles follows by simple substitution. (Note: The corresponding eigenvalue equation gives the Schrödinger equation for the rigid rotor in the form that it was solved for the first time by Kronig and Rabi (for the special case of the symmetric rotor). This is one of the few cases where the Schrödinger equation can be solved analytically. All these cases were solved within a year of the formulation of the Schrödinger equation.)

Nowadays it is common to proceed as follows. It can be shown that $\hat{H}$ can be expressed in body-fixed angular momentum operators (in this proof one must carefully commute differential operators with trigonometric functions). The result has the same appearance as the classical formula expressed in body-fixed coordinates,
$$\hat{H} = \frac{1}{2}\left[ \frac{\mathcal{P}_x^2}{I_1} + \frac{\mathcal{P}_y^2}{I_2} +
\frac{\mathcal{P}_z^2}{I_3} \right].$$
The action of the $\hat{\mathcal{P}}_i$ on the Wigner D-matrix is simple. In particular
$$\mathcal{P}^2\, D^j_{m'm}(\alpha,\beta,\gamma)^* = \hbar^2 j(j+1) D^j_{m'm}(\alpha,\beta,\gamma)^* \quad\hbox{with}\quad
\mathcal{P}^2 = \mathcal{P}^2_x + \mathcal{P}_y^2+ \mathcal{P}_z^2,$$
so that the Schrödinger equation for the spherical rotor ($I=I_1=I_2=I_3$) is solved with the $(2j+1)^2$ degenerate energy equal to $\tfrac{\hbar^2 j(j+1)}{2I}$.

The symmetric top (= symmetric rotor) is characterized by $I_1=I_2$. It is a prolate (cigar shaped) top if $I_3 < I_1 = I_2$. In the latter case we write the Hamiltonian as
$$\hat{H} = \frac{1}{2}\left[ \frac{\mathcal{P}^2}{I_1} + \mathcal{P}_z^2\left(\frac{1}{I_3}
-\frac{1}{I_1} \right) \right],$$
and use that
$$\mathcal{P}_z^2\, D^j_{m k}(\alpha,\beta,\gamma)^* = \hbar^2 k^2\, D^j_{m k}(\alpha,\beta,\gamma)^*.$$
Hence
$$\hat{H}\,D^j_{m k}(\alpha,\beta,\gamma)^* = E_{jk} D^j_{m k}(\alpha,\beta,\gamma)^*$$
with

$$\frac{1}{\hbar^2}E_{jk} = \frac{j(j + 1)}{2I_1} + k^2\left(\frac{1}{2I_3} - \frac{1}{2I_1}\right).$$

The eigenvalue $E_{j0}$ is $2j+1$-fold degenerate, for all eigenfunctions with $m = -j, -j+1, \dots, j$ have the same eigenvalue. The energies with |k| > 0 are $2(2j+1)$-fold degenerate. This exact solution of the Schrödinger equation of the symmetric top was first found in 1927.

The asymmetric top problem ($I_1 \ne I_2 \ne I_3$) is not soluble analytically.

== Direct experimental observation of molecular rotations ==
For a long time, molecular rotations could not be directly observed experimentally. Only measurement techniques with atomic resolution made it possible to detect the rotation of a single molecule. At low temperatures, the rotations of molecules (or part thereof) can be frozen. This could be directly visualized by scanning tunneling microscopy, i.e., the stabilization could be explained at higher temperatures by the rotational entropy. The direct observation of rotational excitation at single molecule level was achieved recently using inelastic electron tunneling spectroscopy with the scanning tunneling microscope. The rotational excitation of molecular hydrogen and its isotopes were detected.

== Applications ==
With the approximation, we can do the following:

- Approximate the bond length using the formula above
- Predict energy changes ($\Delta E$)
- Predict line spacing of a microwave rotational frequencies
- Providing a zeroth order model
- Interpreting molecular identification in spectroscopy
- Offers a basis for selection rules
- Offers a simplified picture of molecular rotation

== See also ==
- Balancing machine
- Gyroscope
- Infrared spectroscopy
- Rigid body
- Rotational spectroscopy
- Spectroscopy
- Vibrational spectroscopy
- Quantum rotor model

== General references ==
- D. M. Dennison (1931). "The Infrared Spectra of Polyatomic Molecules Part I". Rev. Mod. Phys. 3 (2): 280–345. Bibcode:1931RvMP....3..280D. doi:10.1103/RevModPhys.3.280. (Especially Section 2: The Rotation of Polyatomic Molecules).
- Van Vleck, J. H. (1951). "The Coupling of Angular Momentum Vectors in Molecules". Rev. Mod. Phys. 23 (3): 213–227. Bibcode:1951RvMP...23..213V. doi:10.1103/RevModPhys.23.213.
- McQuarrie, Donald A (1983). Quantum Chemistry. Mill Valley, Calif.: University Science Books. ISBN 0-935702-13-X.
- Goldstein, H.; Poole, C. P.; Safko, J. L. (2001). Classical Mechanics (Third ed.). San Francisco: Addison Wesley Publishing Company. ISBN 0-201-65702-3. (Chapters 4 and 5)
- Arnold, V. I. (1989). Mathematical Methods of Classical Mechanics. Springer-Verlag. ISBN 0-387-96890-3. (Chapter 6).
- Kroto, H. W. (1992). Molecular Rotation Spectra. New York: Dover.
- Gordy, W.; Cook, R. L. (1984). Microwave Molecular Spectra (Third ed.). New York: Wiley. ISBN 0-471-08681-9.
- Papoušek, D.; Aliev, M. T. (1982). Molecular Vibrational-Rotational Spectra. Amsterdam: Elsevier. ISBN 0-444-99737-7.
