= Electric dipole transition =

Effect of an electron's interaction with the electromagnetic field

An electric dipole transition is the dominant effect of an interaction of an electron in an atom with the electromagnetic field.

Following the reference, consider an electron in an atom with quantum Hamiltonian $H_0$, interacting with a plane electromagnetic wave

$${\mathbf E}({\mathbf r},t)=E_0 {\hat{\mathbf z}} \cos(ky-\omega t), \ \ \ {\mathbf B}({\mathbf r},t)=B_0{\hat{\mathbf x}} \cos(ky-\omega t).$$

Write the Hamiltonian of the electron in this electromagnetic field as

$$H(t) \ = \ H_0 + W(t).$$

Treating this system by means of time-dependent perturbation theory, one finds that the most likely transitions of the electron from one state to the other occur due to the summand of $W(t)$ defined as

$$W_\mathrm{DE}(t) = \frac{q E_0}{m_e\omega}  p_z \sin \omega t, \,$$

where $q$ and $m_e$ are the charge and mass of a bare electron. Electric dipole transitions are the transitions between energy levels in the system with the Hamiltonian $H_0 + W_\mathrm{DE}(t)$.

Between certain electron states the electric dipole transition rate may be zero due to one or more selection rules, particularly the angular momentum selection rule. In such a case, the transition is termed electric dipole forbidden, and the transitions between such levels must be approximated by higher-order transitions.

The next order summand in $W(t)$ is defined as

$$W_\mathrm{DM}(t) = \frac{q}{2m_e} (L_x + 2S_x) B_0 \cos \omega t \,$$

and describes magnetic dipole transitions.

Even smaller contributions to transition rates are given by higher electric and magnetic multipole transitions.

== Semi-classical approach ==
Three-state model energy diagram

One way of modelling and understanding the effect of light (mainly electric field) on an atom is to look at a simpler model consisting of three energy levels. In this model, we have simplified our atom to a transition between a state of 0 angular momentum ($J_g = 0)$, to a state of angular momentum of 1 ($J_e = 1$). This could be, for example, the transition in hydrogen between the 1s (ground state) and the 2p ($n=1, \ell=1$) state.

In order to understand the effect of the electric field on this simplified atom we are going to choose the electric field linearly polarized with the polarization axis to be parallel with the axis of the $|g\rangle$ to $|e\rangle$ transition, we call this axis the $\hat{z}$ axis. This assumption has no real loss of generality. In fact if we were to choose another axis, then we would be able to find another state that would be a linear combination of the previous states which would be parallel to the electric field bringing us back to this assumption of a linearly polarized electric field parallel with the transition axis.

With this in mind, we can limit ourselves to just the transition from $|g\rangle$ to $|e\rangle$. We are going to use an electric field which can be written as $\vec{E}(\vec{r},t)=\hat{z} \mathcal{E}(\vec{r}) \cos(wt-\phi(\vec{r}))$ where $\hat{z}$ is the transition axis, $w$ is the angular frequency of the light incoming into the atom (think of it as a laser being shone into the atom), $\phi$ is the light phase which can depend on the position, and $\mathcal{E}$ is the amplitude of the laser light.

Now, the main question we want to solve is what is the average force felt by the atom under this kind of light? We are interested by $f = \overline{\langle \hat{F} \rangle} = \overline{\langle -\nabla \hat{V}_{e.d.}(\hat{r}, t) \rangle}$ which represents the average force felt by the atom. In here the brackets represent an average over all the internal states of the atom (in a quantum fashion), and the bar represent a temporal average in the classical fashion. $\hat{V}_{e.d.}$ represents the potential due to the electric dipole of the atom.

This potential can be further be written as $\hat{V}_{e.d} = -\hat{D}\cdot \vec{E}$ where $\hat{D}$ is the dipole transition operator.

The reason we use a two state model is that it allow us to write explicitly the dipole transition operator as $\hat{D} = d_0(|e\rangle \langle g|+|g\rangle \langle e|)$ and thus we get the

$$\hat{V}_{e.d} = -d_0 \mathcal{E}(\hat{\vec{r}})(|e\rangle \langle g|+|g\rangle \langle e|)\cos(\omega t - \phi(\hat{\vec{r}})) = -d_0 \mathcal{E}(\hat{\vec{r}})(\hat{\sigma}_+ + \hat{\sigma}_-)\cos(\omega t - \phi(\hat{\vec{r}}))$$.

Then

$$f(\vec{r}) = \overline{\langle d_0 (\hat{\sigma}_+ + \hat{\sigma}_-)\nabla[\mathcal{E}(\vec{r}) \cos(\omega t - \phi(\hat{\vec{r}})] \rangle} =\overline{ d(\vec{r}, t)  \nabla \mathcal{E}(\vec{r}, t)} = \overline{f(\vec{r}, t)}$$.

Now, the semi-classical approach means that we write the dipole moment as the polarizability of the atom times the electric field:

$$d(\vec{r}, t) = \alpha(\omega)\mathcal{E}(\vec{r}, t)$$

And as such $f(\vec{r}, t) = \alpha(\omega)\mathcal{E}(\vec{r}, t)\nabla \mathcal{E}(\vec{r}, t) = \frac{1}{2}\alpha(\omega)\nabla \mathcal{E}^2(\vec{r}, t)$ and thus $f(\vec{r}) = \nabla [\frac{1}{2}\alpha(\omega) \overline{\mathcal{E}^2(\vec{r}, t)}] = \nabla[ \frac{1}{4}\alpha(\omega) \mathcal{E}^2(\vec{r})]$, and as such we have $V_{e.d} = - \frac{1}{4}\alpha(\omega) \mathcal{E}^2(\vec{r})$.

Before progressing in the math, and trying to find a more explicit expression for the proportionality constant $\alpha(\omega)$, there's an important aspect that we need to discuss. That is that we have found that the potential felt by an atom in a light induced potential follows the square of the time averaged electric field. This is important to a lot of experimental physics in cold atom physics where physicists use this fact to understand what potential is applied to the atoms using the known intensity of the laser light applied to atoms since the intensity of light is proportional itself to the square of the time averaged electric field, i.e. $I \propto\overline{\mathcal{E}^2(\vec{r}, t)}$.

Now, let's look at how to get the expression of the polarizability $\alpha(\omega)$.

We will use the density matrix formalism, and the optical Bloch equations for this.

The main idea here is that the non-diagonal density matrix elements can be written as $\rho_{eg}=Tr(\hat{\sigma}_-\hat{\rho})$ and $\rho_{ge}=Tr(\hat{\sigma}_+\hat{\rho})$. And

$$d(\vec{r}, t) = Tr(\hat{D}\hat{\rho}(t)) = Tr(d_0 (\hat{\sigma}_+ + \hat{\sigma}_-)\rho(t)) = d_0[ Tr(\hat{\sigma}_+\rho(t)) + Tr( \hat{\sigma}_- \rho(t))] = d_0 (\rho_{ge} + \rho_{eg})$$

Here is where the optical Bloch equations will come in handy, they give us an equation to understand the dynamics of the density matrix.

Indeed, we have:

$\frac{d\hat{\rho}(t)}{dt} = \frac{1}{i\hbar}[\hat{H}, \rho]$ which accounts for the reversible normal quantum evolution of the density matrix.

and another term that describes the spontaneous emissions of the atom:

$$\frac{d\hat{\rho}_{eg}(t)}{dt} = - \frac{\Gamma}{2} \hat{\rho}_{eg}, \frac{d\hat{\rho}_{ge}(t)}{dt} = - \frac{\Gamma}{2} \hat{\rho}_{ge}$$

Where $\hat{H}$ is our semi-classical hamiltonian. It is written as $\hat{H} = \hbar \omega_0 |e\rangle \langle e| + V_{e.d.}$. And $\Gamma = \frac{d^2_0\omega^3_0}{3\pi\epsilon_0\hbar c^3}$. $\Gamma$ represents the linewidth of the transition, and thus you can see $\Gamma^{-1}$ as the half-life of the given transition.

Let us introduce the Rabi frequency $\Omega$:

$$\hbar \Omega = -d_0 \mathcal{E}(\vec{r})$$

Then we can write the optical Bloch equations for $\rho_{eg}$ and $\rho_{ge}$:

For this part we take the equation of the evolution of the $\rho$ and take the matrix elements. We get:

$$i\hbar \frac{d\hat{\rho}_{eg}(t)}{dt} = \hbar(\omega_0 - i \frac{\Gamma}{2}) \rho_{eg}-d_0 \mathcal{E}(\vec{r}, t) (\rho_{gg} - \rho_{ee})$$

We can get the equation for $\rho_{ge}$ by taking its complex conjugate.

We can then repeat the process for all 4 matrix elements, but in our study we will apply a small field approximation, so that the electric field is small enough that we can uncouple the 4 equations. This approximation is written mathematically using the Rabi frequency as:

$\Omega \ll |\Delta|, \Gamma$, with $\Delta = \omega - \omega_0$.

Then we can neglect $\rho_{ee} = 0$, and set $\rho_{gg} = 1$. Indeed, the idea behind this is that if the atom doesn't see any light, then to a first degree approximation in $\mathcal{E}$, the atom will be in the ground state and not in the excited state forcing us to set $\rho_{ee} = 0$, $\rho_{gg} = 1$.

We can then rewrite the evolution equation to:

$$\frac{d\hat{\rho}_{eg}(t)}{dt} = -(i\omega_0+\frac{\Gamma}{2})\rho_{eg}-i\Omega \cos(wt-\phi)$$

This is an ordinary first order differential equation with an inhomogeneous term in cosines. This can easily be solved by using the Euler's formula for the cosine.

We get the following solution:

$$\rho_{eg}(t) = \Omega/2\bigg( \frac{e^{-i(\omega t - \phi)}}{\omega - \omega_0 + i \Gamma/2} - \frac{ e^{i(\omega t - \phi)}}{\omega + \omega_0 - i \Gamma /2}\bigg)$$

Furthermore, if we say that the detuning $\Delta$ is much bigger than $\Gamma$, then of course the sum of both $\omega, \omega_0$ is also much bigger than $\Gamma$ and we can rewrite the previous equation as:

$$\rho_{eg}(t) = \Omega/2\bigg( \frac{e^{-i(\omega t - \phi)}}{\omega - \omega_0} - \frac{ e^{i(\omega t - \phi)}}{\omega + \omega_0 }\bigg)$$

and

$$\rho_{ge}(t) = \Omega/2\bigg( \frac{e^{i(\omega t - \phi)}}{\omega - \omega_0} - \frac{ e^{-i(\omega t - \phi)}}{\omega + \omega_0 }\bigg)$$

And coming back to our average dipole moment:

$d(t) = d_0 \Omega/\overline{\Delta} \cos(\omega t - \phi) = -\frac{d^2_0 \mathcal{E}(\vec{r})}{\hbar \overline{\Delta}}\cos(\omega t - \phi)$ with $\frac{1}{\overline{\Delta}} = \frac{1}{\omega - \omega_0} - \frac{1}{\omega +\omega_0}$

Then it is clear that $d(t) = -\frac{d^2_0}{\hbar \overline{\Delta}} \mathcal{E}(\vec{r}, t)$, and the polarizability becomes $\alpha(\omega) = -\frac{d^2_0}{\hbar \overline{\Delta}}$.

Finally, we can write the potential felt by the atom in due to the electric dipole interaction as:

$$V_{e.d.}(\vec{r}) = \frac{d^2_0}{4\hbar \overline{\Delta}}\mathcal{E}^2(\vec{r})$$

The essential points worth discussing here are as said previously that the light intensity $I \propto\overline{\mathcal{E}^2(\vec{r}, t)}$ of the laser produces a proportional local potential which the atoms "feel" in that region. Furthermore, now we can tell the sign of such potential. We see that it follows the sign of $\overline{\Delta}$ which in turn follows the sign of the detuning. This implies that the potential is attractive if we have a red detuned laser ($\omega < \omega_0$), and it is repulsive if we have a blue detuned laser ($\omega > \omega_0$).

== See also ==
- Dipole
- Electric dipole moment
- Electromagnetism
- Magnetic dipole transition
