= Rotational spectroscopy =

Spectroscopy of quantized rotational states of gases

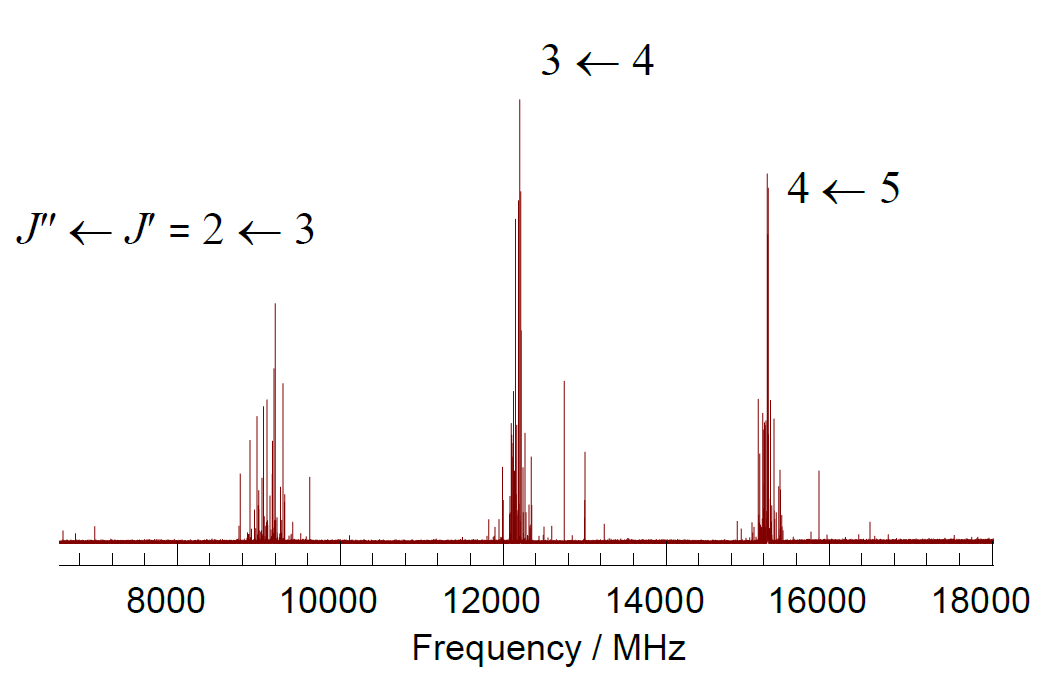
Part of the rotational spectrum of trifluoroiodomethane, CF_{3}I. (Note: The spectrum was measured over a couple of hours with the aid of a chirped-pulse Fourier transform microwave spectrometer at the University of Bristol.) Each rotational transition is labeled with the quantum numbers, J, of the final and initial states, and is extensively split by the effects of nuclear quadrupole coupling with the ^{127}I nucleus.

Rotational spectroscopy is concerned with the measurement of the energies of transitions between quantized rotational states of molecules in the gas phase. The rotational spectrum (power spectral density vs. rotational frequency) of polar molecules can be measured in absorption or emission by microwave spectroscopy or by far infrared spectroscopy. The rotational spectra of non-polar molecules cannot be observed by those methods, but can be observed and measured by Raman spectroscopy. Rotational spectroscopy is sometimes referred to as pure rotational spectroscopy to distinguish it from rotational-vibrational spectroscopy where changes in rotational energy occur together with changes in vibrational energy, and also from ro-vibronic spectroscopy (or just vibronic spectroscopy) where rotational, vibrational and electronic energy changes occur simultaneously.

For rotational spectroscopy, molecules are classified according to symmetry into spherical tops, linear molecules, and symmetric tops; analytical expressions can be derived for the rotational energy terms of these molecules. Analytical expressions can be derived for the fourth category, asymmetric top, for rotational levels up to J=3, but higher energy levels need to be determined using numerical methods. The rotational energies are derived theoretically by considering the molecules to be rigid rotors and then applying extra terms to account for centrifugal distortion, fine structure, hyperfine structure and Coriolis coupling. Fitting the spectra to the theoretical expressions gives numerical values of the angular moments of inertia from which very precise values of molecular bond lengths and angles can be derived in favorable cases. In the presence of an electrostatic field there is Stark splitting which allows molecular electric dipole moments to be determined.

An important application of rotational spectroscopy is in exploration of the chemical composition of the interstellar medium using radio telescopes.

== Applications ==
Rotational spectroscopy has primarily been used to investigate fundamental aspects of molecular physics. It is a uniquely precise tool for the determination of molecular structure in gas-phase molecules. It can be used to establish barriers to internal rotation such as that associated with the rotation of the CH_{3} group relative to the C_{6}H_{4}Cl group in chlorotoluene (C_{7}H_{7}Cl). When fine or hyperfine structure can be observed, the technique also provides information on the electronic structures of molecules. Much of current understanding of the nature of weak molecular interactions such as van der Waals, hydrogen and halogen bonds has been established through rotational spectroscopy. In connection with radio astronomy, the technique has a key role in exploration of the chemical composition of the interstellar medium. Microwave transitions are measured in the laboratory and matched to emissions from the interstellar medium using a radio telescope. NH_{3} was the first stable polyatomic molecule to be identified in the interstellar medium. The measurement of chlorine monoxide is important for atmospheric chemistry. Current projects in astrochemistry involve both laboratory microwave spectroscopy and observations made using modern radiotelescopes such as the Atacama Large Millimeter/submillimeter Array (ALMA).

== Overview ==
A molecule in the gas phase is free to rotate relative to a set of mutually orthogonal axes of fixed orientation in space, centered on the center of mass of the molecule. Free rotation is not possible for molecules in liquid or solid phases due to the presence of intermolecular forces. Rotation about each unique axis is associated with a set of quantized energy levels dependent on the moment of inertia about that axis and a quantum number. Thus, for linear molecules the energy levels are described by a single moment of inertia and a single quantum number, $J$, which defines the magnitude of the rotational angular momentum.

For nonlinear molecules which are symmetric rotors (or symmetric tops - see next section), there are two moments of inertia and the energy also depends on a second rotational quantum number, $K$, which defines the vector component of rotational angular momentum along the principal symmetry axis. Analysis of spectroscopic data with the expressions detailed below results in quantitative determination of the value(s) of the moment(s) of inertia. From these precise values of the molecular structure and dimensions may be obtained.

For a linear molecule, analysis of the rotational spectrum provides values for the rotational constant (Note: This article uses the molecular spectroscopist's convention of expressing the rotational constant $B$ in cm^{−1}. Therefore $B$ in this article corresponds to $\bar B = B/hc$ in the Rigid rotor article.) and the moment of inertia of the molecule, and, knowing the atomic masses, can be used to determine the bond length directly. For diatomic molecules this process is straightforward. For linear molecules with more than two atoms it is necessary to measure the spectra of two or more isotopologues, such as ^{16}O^{12}C^{32}S and ^{16}O^{12}C^{34}S. This allows a set of simultaneous equations to be set up and solved for the bond lengths). (Note: For a symmetric top, the values of the 2 moments of inertia can be used to derive 2 molecular parameters. Values from each additional isotopologue provide the information for one more molecular parameter. For asymmetric tops a single isotopologue provides information for at most 3 molecular parameters.) A bond length obtained in this way is slightly different from the equilibrium bond length. This is because there is zero-point energy in the vibrational ground state, to which the rotational states refer, whereas the equilibrium bond length is at the minimum in the potential energy curve. The relation between the rotational constants is given by

$$B_v = B - \alpha\left(v + \frac{1}{2}\right)$$

where v is a vibrational quantum number and α is a vibration-rotation interaction constant which can be calculated if the B values for two different vibrational states can be found.

For other molecules, if the spectra can be resolved and individual transitions assigned both bond lengths and bond angles can be deduced. When this is not possible, as with most asymmetric tops, all that can be done is to fit the spectra to three moments of inertia calculated from an assumed molecular structure. By varying the molecular structure the fit can be improved, giving a qualitative estimate of the structure. Isotopic substitution is invaluable when using this approach to the determination of molecular structure.

=== Classification of molecular rotors ===
In quantum mechanics the free rotation of a molecule is quantized, so that the rotational energy and the angular momentum can take only certain fixed values, which are related simply to the moment of inertia, $I$, of the molecule. For any molecule, there are three moments of inertia: $I_A$, $I_B$ and $I_C$ about three mutually orthogonal axes A, B, and C with the origin at the center of mass of the system. The general convention, used in this article, is to define the axes such that $I_A \leq I_B \leq I_C$, with axis $A$ corresponding to the smallest moment of inertia. Some authors, however, define the $A$ axis as the molecular rotation axis of highest order.

The particular pattern of energy levels (and, hence, of transitions in the rotational spectrum) for a molecule is determined by its symmetry. A convenient way to look at the molecules is to divide them into four different classes, based on the symmetry of their structure. These are

Spherical tops (spherical rotors)
All three moments of inertia are equal to each other: $I_A = I_B = I_C$. Examples of spherical tops include phosphorus tetramer (P_{4}), carbon tetrachloride (CCl_{4}) and other tetrahalides, methane (CH_{4}), silane, (SiH_{4}), sulfur hexafluoride (SF_{6}) and other hexahalides. The molecules all belong to the cubic point groups T_{d} or O_{h}.
Linear molecules
For a linear molecule the moments of inertia are related by $I_A \ll I_B = I_C$. For most purposes, $I_A$ can be taken to be zero. Examples of linear molecules include dioxygen (O_{2}), dinitrogen (N_{2}), carbon monoxide (CO), hydroxy radical (OH), carbon dioxide (CO_{2}), hydrogen cyanide (HCN), carbonyl sulfide (OCS), acetylene (ethyne (HC≡CH) and dihaloethynes. These molecules belong to the point groups C_{∞v} or D_{∞h}.
Symmetric tops (symmetric rotors)
A symmetric top is a molecule in which two moments of inertia are the same, $I_A = I_B$ or $I_B = I_C$. By definition a symmetric top must have a 3-fold or higher order rotation axis. As a matter of convenience, spectroscopists divide molecules into two classes of symmetric tops, Oblate symmetric tops (saucer or disc shaped) with $I_A = I_B < I_C$ and Prolate symmetric tops (rugby football, or cigar shaped) with $I_A < I_B = I_C$. The spectra look rather different, and are instantly recognizable. Examples of symmetric tops include

Oblate
Benzene, C_{6}H_{6}; ammonia, NH_{3}; xenon tetrafluoride, XeF_{4}
Prolate
Chloromethane, CH_{3}Cl, propyne, CH_{3}C≡CH

As a detailed example, ammonia has a moment of inertia I_{C} = 4.4128 × 10^{−47} kg m^{2} about the 3-fold rotation axis, and moments I_{A} = I_{B} = 2.8059 × 10^{−47} kg m^{2} about any axis perpendicular to the C_{3} axis. Since the unique moment of inertia is larger than the other two, the molecule is an oblate symmetric top.

Asymmetric tops (asymmetric rotors)
The three moments of inertia have different values. Examples of small molecules that are asymmetric tops include water, H_{2}O and nitrogen dioxide, NO_{2} whose symmetry axis of highest order is a 2-fold rotation axis. Most large molecules are asymmetric tops.

=== Selection rules ===
==== Microwave and far-infrared spectra ====
Transitions between rotational states can be observed in molecules with a permanent electric dipole moment. (Note: Such transitions are called electric dipole-allowed transitions. Other transitions involving quadrupoles, octupoles, hexadecapoles etc. may also be allowed but the spectral intensity is very much smaller, so these transitions are difficult to observe. Magnetic-dipole-allowed transitions can occur in paramagnetic molecules such as dioxygen, O_{2} and nitric oxide, NO) A consequence of this rule is that no microwave spectrum can be observed for centrosymmetric linear molecules such as N_{2} (dinitrogen) or HCCH (ethyne), which are non-polar. Tetrahedral molecules such as CH_{4} (methane), which have both a zero dipole moment and isotropic polarizability, would not have a pure rotation spectrum but for the effect of centrifugal distortion; when the molecule rotates about a 3-fold symmetry axis a small dipole moment is created, allowing a weak rotation spectrum to be observed by microwave spectroscopy.

With symmetric tops, the selection rule for electric-dipole-allowed pure rotation transitions is ΔK = 0, ΔJ = ±1. Since these transitions are due to absorption (or emission) of a single photon with a spin of one, conservation of angular momentum implies that the molecular angular momentum can change by at most one unit. Moreover, the quantum number K is limited to have values between and including +J to -J.

==== Raman spectra ====
For Raman spectra the molecules undergo transitions in which an incident photon is absorbed and another scattered photon is emitted. The general selection rule for such a transition to be allowed is that the molecular polarizability must be anisotropic, which means that it is not the same in all directions. Polarizability is a 3-dimensional tensor that can be represented as an ellipsoid. The polarizability ellipsoid of spherical top molecules is in fact spherical so those molecules show no rotational Raman spectrum. For all other molecules both Stokes and anti-Stokes lines (Note: In Raman spectroscopy the photon energies for Stokes and anti-Stokes scattering are respectively less than and greater than the incident photon energy. See the energy-level diagram at Raman spectroscopy.) can be observed and they have similar intensities due to the fact that many rotational states are thermally populated. The selection rule for linear molecules is ΔJ = 0, ±2. The reason for the values ±2 is that the polarizability returns to the same value twice during a rotation. The value ΔJ = 0 does not correspond to a molecular transition but rather to Rayleigh scattering in which the incident photon merely changes direction.

The selection rule for symmetric top molecules is

ΔK = 0
If K = 0, then ΔJ = ±2
If K ≠ 0, then ΔJ = 0, ±1, ±2

Transitions with ΔJ = +1 are said to belong to the R series, whereas transitions with ΔJ = +2 belong to an S series. Since Raman transitions involve two photons, it is possible for the molecular angular momentum to change by two units.

==== Inelastic neutron scattering spectra ====
For molecules with no permanent dipole moment and an isotropic polarizability, such as H_{2} and its isotopologue D_{2}, neither microwave/far-infrared absorption nor Raman spectroscopy can access the pure rotational transitions, since both techniques rely on selection rules tied to the dipole moment or its anisotropy. Inelastic neutron scattering (INS) is not subject to these optical selection rules: the neutron couples directly to the nuclear spin and mass of the scattering nuclei, so all rotational (and translational) transitions are in principle observable, with intensities governed instead by the coherent and incoherent neutron scattering cross sections of the nuclei involved. This makes INS the technique of choice for probing the rotational dynamics of homonuclear diatomic molecules such as H_{2} confined in nanoporous media, including clathrate hydrates, metal–organic frameworks, and fullerene cages, where the rotational fundamental (J=0 → 1) transition — normally forbidden optically for H_{2} — is directly observed, often close to its free-molecule value of about 14.7 meV, together with quantized translational ("rattling") levels arising from spatial confinement. Because ortho- and para-species of H_{2} and D_{2} have distinct nuclear-spin-dependent scattering cross sections, INS can also resolve transitions between these allotropes, a capability not available to dipole- or polarizability-based rotational spectroscopy.

=== Units ===
The units used for rotational constants depend on the type of measurement. With infrared spectra in the wavenumber scale ($\tilde \nu$), the unit is usually the inverse centimeter, written as cm^{−1}, which is literally the number of waves in one centimeter, or the reciprocal of the wavelength in centimeters ($\tilde\nu = 1 / \lambda$). On the other hand, for microwave spectra in the frequency scale ($\nu$), the unit is usually the gigahertz. The relationship between these two units is derived from the expression

$$\nu \cdot \lambda = c,$$

where ν is a frequency, λ is a wavelength and c is the velocity of light. It follows that

$$\tilde \nu / \text{cm}^{-1} =
\frac{1}{\lambda / \text{cm}} =
\frac{\nu / \text{s}^{-1}}{c / \left(\text{cm} \cdot \mathrm{s}^{-1}\right)} =
\frac{\nu / \text{s}^{-1}}{2.99792458 \times 10^{10}}.$$

As 1 GHz = 10^{9} Hz, the numerical conversion can be expressed as

$$\tilde\nu / \text{cm}^{-1} \approx \frac{\nu / \text{GHz}}{30}.$$

=== Effect of vibration on rotation ===
The population of vibrationally excited states follows a Boltzmann distribution, so low-frequency vibrational states are appreciably populated even at room temperatures. As the moment of inertia is higher when a vibration is excited, the rotational constants (B) decrease. Consequently, the rotation frequencies in each vibration state are different from each other. This can give rise to "satellite" lines in the rotational spectrum. An example is provided by cyanodiacetylene, H−C≡C−C≡C−C≡N.

Further, there is a fictitious force, Coriolis coupling, between the vibrational motion of the nuclei in the rotating (non-inertial) frame. However, as long as the vibrational quantum number does not change (i.e., the molecule is in only one state of vibration), the effect of vibration on rotation is not important, because the time for vibration is much shorter than the time required for rotation. The Coriolis coupling is often negligible, too, if one is interested in low vibrational and rotational quantum numbers only.

=== Effect of rotation on vibrational spectra ===
Historically, the theory of rotational energy levels was developed to account for observations of vibration-rotation spectra of gases in infrared spectroscopy, which was used before microwave spectroscopy had become practical. To a first approximation, the rotation and vibration can be treated as separable, so the energy of rotation is added to the energy of vibration. For example, the rotational energy levels for linear molecules (in the rigid-rotor approximation) are

$$E_\text{rot} = hc BJ(J + 1).$$

In this approximation, the vibration-rotation wavenumbers of transitions are

$$\tilde\nu = \tilde\nu_\text{vib} + B''J''(J'' + 1) - B'J'(J' + 1),$$

where $B''$ and $B'$ are rotational constants for the upper and lower vibrational state respectively, while $J''$ and $J'$ are the rotational quantum numbers of the upper and lower levels. In reality, this expression has to be modified for the effects of anharmonicity of the vibrations, for centrifugal distortion and for Coriolis coupling.

For the so-called R branch of the spectrum, $J' = J'' + 1$ so that there is simultaneous excitation of both vibration and rotation. For the P branch, $J' = J'' - 1$ so that a quantum of rotational energy is lost while a quantum of vibrational energy is gained. The purely vibrational transition, $\Delta J=0$, gives rise to the Q branch of the spectrum. Because of the thermal population of the rotational states the P branch is slightly less intense than the R branch.

Rotational constants obtained from infrared measurements are in good accord with those obtained by microwave spectroscopy, while the latter usually offers greater precision.

== Structure of rotational spectra ==
=== Spherical top ===
Spherical top molecules have no net dipole moment. A pure rotational spectrum cannot be observed by absorption or emission spectroscopy because there is no permanent dipole moment whose rotation can be accelerated by the electric field of an incident photon. Also the polarizability is isotropic, so that pure rotational transitions cannot be observed by Raman spectroscopy either. Nevertheless, rotational constants can be obtained by ro–vibrational spectroscopy. This occurs when a molecule is polar in the vibrationally excited state. For example, the molecule methane is a spherical top but the asymmetric C-H stretching band shows rotational fine structure in the infrared spectrum, illustrated in rovibrational coupling. This spectrum is also interesting because it shows clear evidence of Coriolis coupling in the asymmetric structure of the band.

=== Linear molecules ===
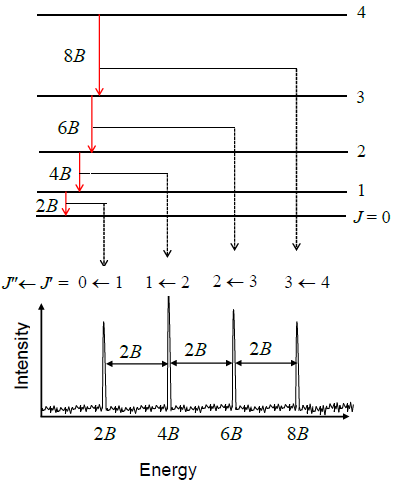
Energy levels and line positions calculated in the rigid rotor approximation

The rigid rotor is a good starting point from which to construct a model of a rotating molecule. It is assumed that component atoms are point masses connected by rigid bonds. A linear molecule lies on a single axis and each atom moves on the surface of a sphere around the centre of mass. The two degrees of rotational freedom correspond to the spherical coordinates θ and φ which describe the direction of the molecular axis, and the quantum state is determined by two quantum numbers J and M. J defines the magnitude of the rotational angular momentum, and M its component about an axis fixed in space, such as an external electric or magnetic field. In the absence of external fields, the energy depends only on J. Under the rigid rotor model, the rotational energy levels, F(J), of the molecule can be expressed as,

$$F\left( J \right) = B J \left( J+1 \right) \qquad J = 0,1,2,...$$

where $B$ is the rotational constant of the molecule and is related to the moment of inertia of the molecule. In a linear molecule the moment of inertia about an axis perpendicular to the molecular axis is unique, that is, $I_B = I_C, I_A=0$, so

$$B = {h \over{8\pi^2cI_B}}= {h \over{8\pi^2cI_C}}$$

For a diatomic molecule

$$I=\frac{m_1m_2}{m_1 +m_2}d^2$$

where m_{1} and m_{2} are the masses of the atoms and d is the distance between them.

Selection rules dictate that during emission or absorption the rotational quantum number has to change by unity; i.e., $\Delta J = J^{\prime} - J^{\prime\prime} = \pm 1$. Thus, the locations of the lines in a rotational spectrum will be given by

$$\tilde \nu_{J^{\prime}\leftrightarrow J^{\prime\prime}} = F\left( J^{\prime} \right) - F\left( J^{\prime\prime} \right) = 2 B \left( J^{\prime\prime} + 1 \right) \qquad J^{\prime\prime} = 0,1,2,...$$

where $J^{\prime\prime}$ denotes the lower level and $J^{\prime}$ denotes the upper level involved in the transition.

The diagram illustrates rotational transitions that obey the $\Delta J$=1 selection rule. The dashed lines show how these transitions map onto features that can be observed experimentally. Adjacent $J^{\prime\prime}{\leftarrow}J^{\prime}$ transitions are separated by 2B in the observed spectrum. Frequency or wavenumber units can also be used for the x axis of this plot.

==== Rotational line intensities ====
Rotational level populations with Bhc/kT = 0.05. J is the quantum number of the lower rotational state.

The probability of a transition taking place is the most important factor influencing the intensity of an observed rotational line. This probability is proportional to the population of the initial state involved in the transition. The population of a rotational state depends on two factors. The number of molecules in an excited state with quantum number J, relative to the number of molecules in the ground state, N_{J}/N_{0} is given by the Boltzmann distribution as

$$\frac{N_J}{N_0} = e^{-\frac{E_J}{kT}} = e^{-\frac {BhcJ(J+1)}{kT}}$$,

where k is the Boltzmann constant and T the absolute temperature. This factor decreases as J increases. The second factor is the degeneracy of the rotational state, which is equal to 2J + 1. This factor increases as J increases. Combining the two factors

$$\text{population} \propto (2J + 1)e^{-\frac{E_J}{kT}}$$

The maximum relative intensity occurs at (Note: This value of J corresponds to the maximum of the population considered as a continuous function of J. However, since only integer values of J are allowed, the maximum line intensity is observed for a neighboring integer J.)

$$J = \sqrt{\frac{kT}{2hcB}} - \frac{1}{2}$$

The diagram at the right shows an intensity pattern roughly corresponding to the spectrum above it.

==== Centrifugal distortion ====
When a molecule rotates, the centrifugal force pulls the atoms apart. As a result, the moment of inertia of the molecule increases, thus decreasing the value of $B$, when it is calculated using the expression for the rigid rotor. To account for this a centrifugal distortion correction term is added to the rotational energy levels of the diatomic molecule.

$$F\left( J \right) = B J \left( J+1 \right) - D J^2 \left( J+1 \right)^2 \qquad J = 0,1,2,...$$

where $D$ is the centrifugal distortion constant.

Therefore, the line positions for the rotational mode change to

$$\tilde \nu_{J^{\prime}\leftrightarrow J^{\prime\prime}} = 2 B \left( J^{\prime\prime} + 1 \right) - 4 D \left( J^{\prime\prime} +1 \right)^3 \qquad J^{\prime\prime} = 0,1,2,...$$

In consequence, the spacing between lines is not constant, as in the rigid rotor approximation, but decreases with increasing rotational quantum number.

An assumption underlying these expressions is that the molecular vibration follows simple harmonic motion. In the harmonic approximation the centrifugal constant $D$ can be derived as

$$D = \frac{h^3}{32 \pi^4 I^2 r^2 k c}$$

where k is the vibrational force constant. The relationship between $B$ and $D$

$$D=\frac{4 B^3}{\tilde \omega ^2}$$

where $\tilde \omega$ is the harmonic vibration frequency, follows. If anharmonicity is to be taken into account, terms in higher powers of J should be added to the expressions for the energy levels and line positions. A striking example concerns the rotational spectrum of hydrogen fluoride which was fitted to terms up to [J(J+1)]^{5}.

==== Oxygen ====
The electric dipole moment of the dioxygen molecule, O_{2} is zero, but the molecule is paramagnetic with two unpaired electrons so that there are magnetic-dipole allowed transitions which can be observed by microwave spectroscopy. The unit electron spin has three spatial orientations with respect to the given molecular rotational angular momentum vector, K, so that each rotational level is split into three states, J = K + 1, K, and K - 1, each J state of this so-called p-type triplet arising from a different orientation of the spin with respect to the rotational motion of the molecule. The energy difference between successive J terms in any of these triplets is about 2 cm^{−1} (60 GHz), with the single exception of J = 1←0 difference which is about 4 cm^{−1}. Selection rules for magnetic dipole transitions allow transitions between successive members of the triplet (ΔJ = ±1) so that for each value of the rotational angular momentum quantum number K there are two allowed transitions. The ^{16}O nucleus has zero nuclear spin angular momentum, so that symmetry considerations demand that K have only odd values.

=== Symmetric top ===
For symmetric rotors a quantum number J is associated with the total angular momentum of the molecule. For a given value of J, there is a 2J+1- fold degeneracy with the quantum number, M taking the values +J ...0 ... -J. The third quantum number, K is associated with rotation about the principal rotation axis of the molecule. In the absence of an external electrical field, the rotational energy of a symmetric top is a function of only J and K and, in the rigid rotor approximation, the energy of each rotational state is given by

$$F\left( J,K \right) = B J \left( J+1 \right) + \left( A - B \right) K^2 \qquad
J = 0, 1, 2, \ldots \quad \mbox{and}\quad K = +J, \ldots, 0, \ldots, -J$$

where $B = {h\over{8\pi^2cI_B}}$ and $A = {h\over{8\pi^2cI_A}}$ for a prolate symmetric top molecule or $A = {h\over{8\pi^2cI_C}}$ for an oblate molecule.

This gives the transition wavenumbers as

$$\tilde \nu_{J^{\prime}\leftrightarrow J^{\prime\prime},K} = F\left( J^{\prime},K \right) - F\left( J^{\prime\prime},K \right)
= 2 B \left( J^{\prime\prime} + 1 \right)
\qquad J^{\prime\prime} = 0,1,2,...$$

which is the same as in the case of a linear molecule. With a first order correction for centrifugal distortion the transition wavenumbers become

$$\tilde \nu_{J^{\prime}\leftrightarrow J^{\prime\prime},K} = F\left( J^{\prime},K \right) - F\left( J^{\prime\prime},K \right)
= 2 \left(B - 2D_{JK}K^2 \right)
\left( J^{\prime\prime} + 1 \right)
-4D_J\left(J^{\prime\prime}+1\right)^3 \qquad J^{\prime\prime} = 0,1,2,...$$

The term in D_{JK} has the effect of removing degeneracy present in the rigid rotor approximation, with different K values.

=== Asymmetric top ===
Pure rotation spectrum of atmospheric water vapour measured at Mauna Kea (33 cm^{−1} to 100 cm^{−1})

The quantum number J refers to the total angular momentum, as before. Since there are three independent moments of inertia, there are two other independent quantum numbers to consider, but the term values for an asymmetric rotor cannot be derived in closed form. They are obtained by individual matrix diagonalization for each J value. Formulae are available for molecules whose shape approximates to that of a symmetric top.

The water molecule is an important example of an asymmetric top. It has an intense pure rotation spectrum in the far infrared region, below about 200 cm^{−1}. For this reason far infrared spectrometers have to be freed of atmospheric water vapour either by purging with a dry gas or by evacuation. The spectrum has been analyzed in detail.

== Quadrupole splitting ==
When a nucleus has a spin quantum number, I, greater than 1/2 it has a quadrupole moment. In that case, coupling of nuclear spin angular momentum with rotational angular momentum causes splitting of the rotational energy levels. If the quantum number J of a rotational level is greater than I, 2I + 1 levels are produced; but if J is less than I, 2J + 1 levels result. The effect is one type of hyperfine splitting. For example, with ^{14}N (I = 1) in HCN, all levels with J > 0 are split into 3. The energies of the sub-levels are proportional to the nuclear quadrupole moment and a function of F and J. where F = J + I, J + I − 1, …, |J − I|. Thus, observation of nuclear quadrupole splitting permits the magnitude of the nuclear quadrupole moment to be determined. This is an alternative method to the use of nuclear quadrupole resonance spectroscopy. The selection rule for rotational transitions becomes

$$\Delta J = \pm 1, \Delta F = 0, \pm 1$$

== Stark and Zeeman effects ==
In the presence of a static external electric field the 2J + 1 degeneracy of each rotational state is partly removed, an instance of a Stark effect. For example, in linear molecules each energy level is split into J + 1 components. The magnitude of splitting scales with the square of the electric field strength and the square of the dipole moment of the molecule, and depends on the strength of the state's coupling to the neighbouring states (linear stark effect) or more distant states (higher-order stark effect). In principle this provides a means to determine the value of the molecular dipole moment with high precision. Examples include carbonyl sulfide, OCS, with μ = 0.71521 ± 0.00020 debye. However, because the splitting depends on μ^{2}, the orientation of the dipole must be deduced from quantum mechanical considerations.

A similar removal of degeneracy will occur when a paramagnetic molecule is placed in a magnetic field, an instance of the Zeeman effect. Most species which can be observed in the gaseous state are diamagnetic . Exceptions are odd-electron molecules such as nitric oxide, NO, nitrogen dioxide, NO_{2}, some chlorine oxides and the hydroxyl radical. The Zeeman effect has been observed with dioxygen, O_{2}.

== Rotational Raman spectroscopy ==
Molecular rotational transitions can also be observed by Raman spectroscopy. Rotational transitions are Raman-allowed for any molecule with an anisotropic polarizability which includes all molecules except for spherical tops. This means that rotational transitions of molecules with no permanent dipole moment, which cannot be observed in absorption or emission, can be observed, by scattering, in Raman spectroscopy. Very high resolution Raman spectra can be obtained by adapting a Fourier Transform Infrared Spectrometer. An example is the spectrum of ^{15}N_{2}. It shows the effect of nuclear spin, resulting in intensities variation of 3:1 in adjacent lines. A bond length of 109.9985 ± 0.0010 pm was deduced from the data.

== Instruments and methods ==
The great majority of contemporary spectrometers use a mixture of commercially available and bespoke components which users integrate according to their particular needs. Instruments can be broadly categorised according to their general operating principles. Although rotational transitions can be found across a very broad region of the electromagnetic spectrum, fundamental physical constraints exist on the operational bandwidth of instrument components. It is often impractical and costly to switch to measurements within an entirely different frequency region. The instruments and operating principals described below are generally appropriate to microwave spectroscopy experiments conducted at frequencies between 6 and 24 GHz.

=== Absorption cells and Stark modulation ===
A microwave spectrometer can be most simply constructed using a source of microwave radiation, an absorption cell into which sample gas can be introduced and a detector such as a superheterodyne receiver. A spectrum can be obtained by sweeping the frequency of the source while detecting the intensity of transmitted radiation. A simple section of waveguide can serve as an absorption cell. An important variation of the technique in which an alternating current is applied across electrodes within the absorption cell results in a modulation of the frequencies of rotational transitions. This is referred to as Stark modulation and allows the use of phase-sensitive detection methods offering improved sensitivity. Absorption spectroscopy allows the study of samples that are thermodynamically stable at room temperature. The first study of the microwave spectrum of a molecule (NH_{3}) was performed by Cleeton & Williams in 1934. Subsequent experiments exploited powerful sources of microwaves such as the klystron, many of which were developed for radar during the Second World War. The number of experiments in microwave spectroscopy surged immediately after the war. By 1948, Walter Gordy was able to prepare a review of the results contained in approximately 100 research papers. Commercial versions of microwave absorption spectrometer were developed by Hewlett-Packard in the 1970s and were once widely used for fundamental research. Most research laboratories now exploit either Balle-Flygare or chirped-pulse Fourier transform microwave (FTMW) spectrometers.

=== Fourier transform microwave (FTMW) spectroscopy ===
The theoretical framework underpinning FTMW spectroscopy is analogous to that used to describe FT-NMR spectroscopy. The behaviour of the evolving system is described by optical Bloch equations. First, a short (typically 0-3 microsecond duration) microwave pulse is introduced on resonance with a rotational transition. Those molecules that absorb the energy from this pulse are induced to rotate coherently in phase with the incident radiation. De-activation of the polarisation pulse is followed by microwave emission that accompanies decoherence of the molecular ensemble. This free induction decay occurs on a timescale of 1-100 microseconds depending on instrument settings. Following pioneering work by Dicke and co-workers in the 1950s, the first FTMW spectrometer was constructed by Ekkers and Flygare in 1975.

==== Balle–Flygare FTMW spectrometer ====
Balle, Campbell, Keenan and Flygare demonstrated that the FTMW technique can be applied within a "free space cell" comprising an evacuated chamber containing a Fabry-Perot cavity. This technique allows a sample to be probed only milliseconds after it undergoes rapid cooling to only a few kelvins in the throat of an expanding gas jet. This was a revolutionary development because (i) cooling molecules to low temperatures concentrates the available population in the lowest rotational energy levels. Coupled with benefits conferred by the use of a Fabry-Perot cavity, this brought a great enhancement in the sensitivity and resolution of spectrometers along with a reduction in the complexity of observed spectra; (ii) it became possible to isolate and study molecules that are very weakly bound because there is insufficient energy available for them to undergo fragmentation or chemical reaction at such low temperatures. William Klemperer was a pioneer in using this instrument for the exploration of weakly bound interactions. While the Fabry-Perot cavity of a Balle-Flygare FTMW spectrometer can typically be tuned into resonance at any frequency between 6 and 18 GHz, the bandwidth of individual measurements is restricted to about 1 MHz. An animation illustrates the operation of this instrument which is currently the most widely used tool for microwave spectroscopy.

==== Chirped-Pulse FTMW spectrometer ====
Noting that digitisers and related electronics technology had significantly progressed since the inception of FTMW spectroscopy, B.H. Pate at the University of Virginia designed a spectrometer which retains many advantages of the Balle-Flygare FT-MW spectrometer while innovating in (i) the use of a high speed (>4 GS/s) arbitrary waveform generator to generate a "chirped" microwave polarisation pulse that sweeps up to 12 GHz in frequency in less than a microsecond and (ii) the use of a high speed (>40 GS/s) oscilloscope to digitise and Fourier transform the molecular free induction decay. The result is an instrument that allows the study of weakly bound molecules but which is able to exploit a measurement bandwidth (12 GHz) that is greatly enhanced compared with the Balle-Flygare FTMW spectrometer. Modified versions of the original CP-FTMW spectrometer have been constructed by a number of groups in the United States, Canada and Europe. The instrument offers a broadband capability that is highly complementary to the high sensitivity and resolution offered by the Balle-Flygare design.

== Bibliography ==
- Atkins, P. W.; de Paula, J. (2006). "Molecular Spectroscopy: Section: Pure rotation spectra". Physical Chemistry (8th ed.). Oxford University Press. pp. 431–469. ISBN 0-19-870072-5.
- Banwell, Colin N.; McCash, Elaine M. (1994). Fundamentals of Molecular Spectroscopy (4th ed.). McGraw-Hill. ISBN 0-07-707976-0.
- Brown, John M.; Carrington, Alan (2003). Rotational spectroscopy of diatomic molecule. Cambridge University Press. ISBN 0-521-53078-4.
- Hollas, M. J. (1996). Modern Spectroscopy (3rd ed.). Wiley. ISBN 0-471-96522-7.
- Kroto, H. W. (2003). Molecular Rotation Spectroscopy. Dover. ISBN 0-486-49540-X.
- McQuarrie, Donald A. (2008). Quantum Chemistry. University Science Books. ISBN 978-1-891389-50-4.
- Townes, Charles H.; Schawlow, Arthur L. (1975). Microwave Spectroscopy. Dover. ISBN 978-0-486-61798-5.
- Kovács, István (1969). Rotational Structure in the Spectra of Diatomic Molecules. Adam Hilger. ISBN 0-85274-142-1.
- Wollrab, James E. (1967). Rotational spectra and molecular structure. Academic Press. ISBN 1-4831-9485-X.
