= Spin-forbidden reactions =

Chemical reaction involving a change in spin state

In chemistry, reactions that involve a change in spin state are known as spin-forbidden reactions. Such reactions show increased activation energy when compared to a similar reaction in which the spin states of the reactant and product are isomorphic. As a result of this increased activation energy, a decreased rate of reaction is observed. A famous example of spin-forbidden reaction is the very slow reaction of O_{2} with hydrocarbons.

== Examples ==
The dissociation of nitrous oxide is a well-studied process:

N_{2}O → N_{2} + O

O atoms have a triplet ground state.

Methoxy cation has a triplet ground state. In a mass spectrometer, it dissociates into singlet products (formyl cation and H_{2}):

CH_{3}O^{+} → H_{2} + HCO^{+}

Numerous spin-forbidden reactions are encountered in transition metal chemistry since many metal ions can adopt multiple spin states. For example, ferrous porphyrin complexes containing one axial donor are high spin ferrous. These complexes, which are represented by myoglobin and hemoglobin, bind CO to give singlet products:

Fe(porphyrin)L + CO → OC−Fe(porphyrin)L

Cobalt(I) dicarbonyl complexes of a trispyrazolylborate are diamagnetic. The corresponding monocarbonyls have triplet ground states.

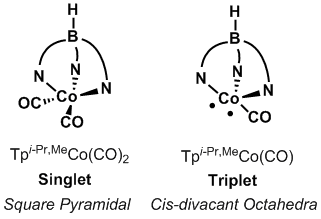
Singlet and Triplet Cobalt Complexes. The ground state of Tp^{i-Pr,Me}Co(CO) has two unpaired electrons.

The addition of CO to Fe(CO)_{4} is an example showing the slowing effect of spin-forbidden reaction takes place when Fe(CO)_{x} is placed under CO pressure.

Fe(CO)_{4} + CO → Fe(CO)_{5}

== Changing spin states ==
When a reaction converts a metal from a singlet to triplet state (or vice versa):

1. The energy of the two spin states must be nearly equal, as dictated by temperature,
2. A mechanism is required to change spin states.

Strong spin-orbital coupling can satisfy the 2nd condition. Parameter 1, however, can lead to very slow reactions due to large disparities between the metal complex's potential energy surfaces, which only cross at high energy leading to a substantial activation barrier.

Spin-forbidden reactions formally fall into the category of electronically non-adiabatic reactions. In general, potential energy surfaces fall into either the adiabatic and diabatic classification. Potential Energy Surfaces that are adiabatic rely on the use of the full electronic Hamiltonian, which includes the spin-orbit term. Those that are diabatic are likewise derived by solving the eigenvalues of the Schrödinger equation, but in this case one or more terms are omitted.

=== Non-adiabatic transition ===
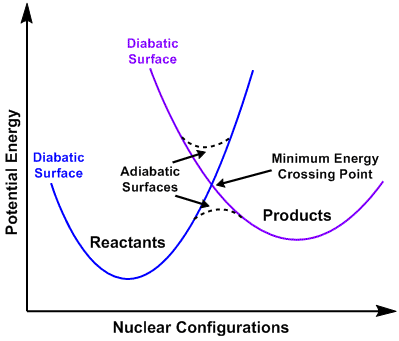
Potential energy surfaces for spin-forbidden reactions of both diabatic and adiabatic variety. The difference between the two adiabatic surfaces is 2H_{12}, where H_{12} = <Ψ_{1}|H_{soc}|Ψ_{2}>.

Once a minimum energy crossing point is reached and parameter 1 above is satisfied, the system needs to hop from one diabatic surface to the other, as stated above by parameter 2. At a given energy (E), the rate coefficient [k(E)] of a spin-forbidden reaction can be calculated using the density of rovibrational states of the reactant [ρ(E)] and the effective integrated density of states in the crossing seam between the two surfaces [N_{er}(E)].

$$k(E)=N_{cr}(E) / hp(E)$$

where

$$N_{cr}(E) = \int dE_h \rho_{cr}(E-E_h)p_{sh}(E_h)$$

The probability of hopping (p_{sh}) is calculated from Landau-Zener theory giving

$$p_{sh}(E) = (1-P_{LZ})(1+P_{LZ})$$

where

$$P_{LZ} = \exp\left ( \frac{-2\pi H_{12}^2}{n\Delta F} \sqrt{\frac{\mu}{2E}} \right)$$

in which the spin-orbit coupling derived off the diagonal Hamiltonian matrix element between two electronic states (H_{12}), the relative slope of the two surfaces at the crossing seam [F(Δ)], the reduced mass of the system through its movement along the hopping coordinate (μ), and the kinetic energy of the system passing through the crossing point (E) are used.

It is useful to note that when E_{h} < E_{c} (when below the minimum energy crossing point) the probability of hopping between spin states is null.

== Application to catalysis ==
=== C-H activation ===
Insertion into C-H bonds, known as C-H activation, is an integral first step in C-H functionalization. For some metal complexes with identical ligands, C-H activation is rapid when one metal is used and slow when other metals are used, often first row transition metals, due to the spin allowed nature of the former case and the spin-forbidden nature of the latter case. The difference in rates of C-H activation of methane for CoCp(CO), RhCp(CO), and IrCp(CO) readily demonstrate this property. CoCp(CO), the starting material in a C-H activation, exists in a triplet spin state while RhCp(CO) exists in a singlet state, with the triplet state only 5.9 kcal/mol away. IrCp(CO) is unique among these complexes in that its starting state is essentially degenerate between the triplet and singlet states. The given product of C-H insertion, CpMH(CO)(CH_{3}), where M = Co, Rh, Ir, is in a singlet state meaning that the C-H activation with CoCp(CO) must reach the minimum energy crossing point for the reactant and product's potential energy surfaces, thus requiring relatively high energies to proceed.

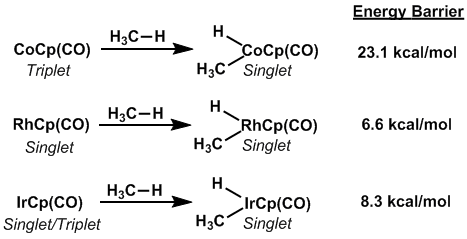

=== Oxidation chemistry ===
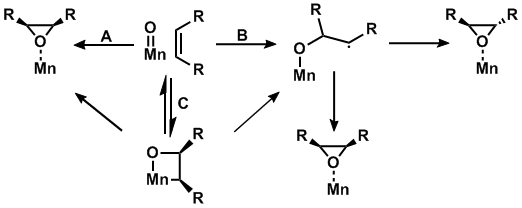
Reactions of manganese-oxo complexes with alkenes. Depending on the spin state of the starting material, triplet or quintet in this case, route A, B, or C can be followed, yielding potentially different products. The reactions also proceed differently for different R substitutes, where one is always alkyl and the second one is alkyl in the case of route A, aryl, alkenyl, or alkynyl in the case of route B, or alkyl, aryl, alkenyl, or alkynyl for route C. For routes B and C, the alkyl R is internal for the radical case.

Metal-oxo species, due to their small spatial extent of metal-centered d orbitals leading to weak bonding, often have similar energies for both the low spin ($\ce{M=O}$) and high spin configuration ($\ce{*M-O*}$). This similarity in energy between the low- and high spin configurations of oxo-species lends itself to the study of spin-forbidden reactions, such as Mn(salen)-catalyzed epoxidation. The Mn(salen)-oxo species can exist in either a triplet or quintet state. While the product of the quintet lies at a lower energy, both the triplet and quintet products can be observed.

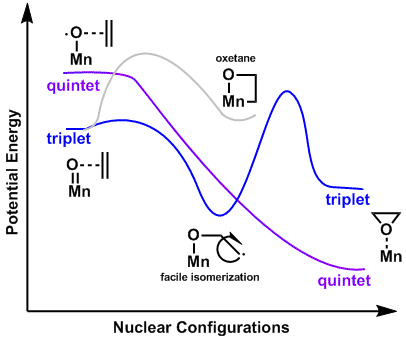
