= Rotational energy =

Kinetic energy of rotating body with moment of inertia and angular velocity

Rotational energy or angular kinetic energy is kinetic energy due to the rotation of an object and is part of its total kinetic energy. Looking at rotational energy separately around an object's axis of rotation, the following dependence on the object's moment of inertia is observed: $E_\text{rotational} = \tfrac{1}{2} I \omega^2$ where

- $\omega \$ is the angular velocity
- $I \$ is the moment of inertia around the axis of rotation
- $E \$ is the kinetic energy

The mechanical work required for or applied during rotation is the torque times the rotation angle. The instantaneous power of an angularly accelerating body is the torque times the angular velocity. For free-floating (unattached) objects, the axis of rotation is commonly around its center of mass.

Note the close relationship between the result for rotational energy and the energy held by linear (or translational) motion: $E_\text{translational} = \tfrac{1}{2} m v^2$

In the rotating system, the moment of inertia, I, takes the role of the mass, m, and the angular velocity, $\omega$, takes the role of the linear velocity, v. The rotational energy of a rolling cylinder varies from one half of the translational energy (if it is massive) to the same as the translational energy (if it is hollow).

An example is the calculation of the rotational kinetic energy of the Earth. As the Earth has a sidereal rotation period of 23.93 hours, it has an angular velocity of 7.29×10^{−5} rad·s^{−1}. The Earth has a moment of inertia, I = 8.04×10^{37} kg·m^{2}. Therefore, it has a rotational kinetic energy of 2.14×10^{29} J.

Part of the Earth's rotational energy can also be tapped using tidal power. Additional friction of the two global tidal waves creates energy in a physical manner, infinitesimally slowing down Earth's angular velocity ω. Due to the conservation of angular momentum, this process transfers angular momentum to the Moon's orbital motion, increasing its distance from Earth and its orbital period (see tidal locking for a more detailed explanation of this process).

== See also ==
- Flywheel
- List of energy storage projects
- Rigid rotor
- Rotational spectroscopy
