= Rotational–vibrational coupling =

When the angular frequency of a system matches its natural vibrational frequency

Two particles connected by a spring. In the absence of the spring, the particles would fly apart. However, the force exerted by the extended spring pulls the particles onto a periodic, oscillatory path.

In physics, rotational–vibrational coupling occurs when the rotation frequency of a system is close to or identical to a natural frequency of internal vibration. The animation on the right shows ideal motion, with the force exerted by the spring and the distance from the center of rotation increasing together linearly with no friction.

In rotational-vibrational coupling, angular velocity oscillates. By pulling the circling masses closer together, the spring transfers its stored strain energy into the kinetic energy of the circling masses, increasing their angular velocity. The spring cannot bring the circling masses together, since the spring's pull weakens as the circling masses approach. At some point, the increasing angular velocity of the circling masses overcomes the pull of the spring, causing the circling masses to increasingly distance themselves. This increasingly strains the spring, strengthening its pull and causing the circling masses to transfer their kinetic energy into the spring's strain energy, thereby decreasing the circling masses' angular velocity. At some point, the pull of the spring overcomes the angular velocity of the circling masses, restarting the cycle.

In helicopter design, helicopters must incorporate damping devices, because at specific angular velocities, the rotorblade vibrations can reinforce themselves by rotational-vibrational coupling, and build up catastrophically. Without damping, these vibrations would cause the rotorblades to break loose.

== Energy conversions ==
The motion of the circling masses mapped in a coordinate system that is rotating at a constant angular velocity

Harmonic oscillation the restoring force is proportional to the distance from the center.

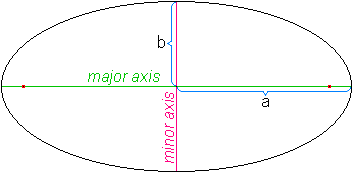

The animation on the right provides a clearer view on the oscillation of the angular velocity. There is a close analogy with harmonic oscillation.

When a harmonic oscillation is at its midpoint then all the energy of the system is kinetic energy. When the harmonic oscillation is at the points furthest away from the midpoint all the energy of the system is potential energy. The energy of the system is oscillating back and forth between kinetic energy and potential energy.

In the animation with the two circling masses there is a back and forth oscillation of kinetic energy and potential energy. When the spring is at its maximal extension then the potential energy is largest, when the angular velocity is at its maximum the kinetic energy is at largest.

With a real spring there is friction involved. With a real spring the vibration will be damped and the final situation will be that the masses circle each other at a constant distance, with a constant tension of the spring.

== Mathematical derivation ==
This discussion applies the following simplifications: the spring itself is taken as being weightless, and the spring is taken as being a perfect spring; the restoring force increases in a linear way as the spring is stretched out. That is, the restoring force is exactly proportional to the distance from the center of rotation. A restoring force with this characteristic is called a harmonic force.

The following parametric equation of the position as a function of time describes the motion of the circling masses:

$$x = a \cos(\omega t)$$	1

$$y = b \sin(\omega t)$$	2

where

- $a$ is the major radius
- $b$ is the minor radius
- $\omega$ is 360° divided by the duration of one revolution

The motion as a function of time can also be seen as a vector combination of two uniform circular motions. The parametric equations (1) and (2) can be rewritten as:

Motion due to a harmonic force described as circle + epi-circle motion

$$x = \left(\tfrac{a+b}{2}\right)\cos(\omega t) + \left(\tfrac{a-b}{2}\right)\cos(\omega t)$$
$$y = \left(\tfrac{a+b}{2}\right)\sin(\omega t) - \left(\tfrac{a-b}{2}\right)\sin(\omega t)$$

A transformation to a coordinate system that subtracts the overall circular motion leaves the eccentricity of the ellipse-shaped trajectory. the center of the eccentricity is located at a distance of $(a+b)/2$ from the main center:

$$x =   \left(\tfrac{a-b}{2}\right) \cos (2 \omega t)$$
$$y = - \left(\tfrac{a-b}{2}\right) \sin (2 \omega t)$$

That is in fact what is seen in the second animation, in which the motion is mapped to a coordinate system that is rotating at a constant angular velocity. The angular velocity of the motion with respect to the rotating coordinate system is 2ω, twice the angular velocity of the overall motion. The spring is continuously doing work. More precisely, the spring is oscillating between doing positive work (increasing the weight's kinetic energy) and doing negative work (decreasing the weight's kinetic energy)

=== Discussion using vector notation ===
The centripetal force is a harmonic force.

$$\mathbf{F} = -\ C \mathbf{r}$$

The set of all solutions to the above equation of motion consists of both circular trajectories and ellipse-shaped trajectories. All the solutions have the same period of revolution. This is a distinctive feature of motion under the influence of a harmonic force; all trajectories take the same amount of time to complete a revolution.

When a rotating coordinate system is used the centrifugal term and the Coriolis term are added to the equation of motion. The following equation gives the acceleration with respect to a rotating system of an object in inertial motion.

$$a \ = \ \Omega^2 \mathbf{r} \ + \ 2 (\boldsymbol{\Omega} \times \mathbf{v})$$

Here, Ω is the angular velocity of the rotating coordinate system with respect to the inertial coordinate system. v is velocity of the moving object with respect to the rotating coordinate system. The centrifugal term is determined by the angular velocity of the rotating coordinate system; the centrifugal term does not relate to the motion of the object.

In all, this gives the following three terms in the equation of motion for motion with respect to a coordinate system rotating with angular velocity Ω.

$$\mathbf{F} = -\ C \mathbf{r} + m \Omega^2 \mathbf{r} + 2 m (\boldsymbol{\Omega} \times \mathbf{v})$$

Both the centripetal force and the centrifugal term in the equation of motion are proportional to r. The angular velocity of the rotating coordinate system is adjusted to have the same period of revolution as the object following an ellipse-shaped trajectory. Hence the vector of the centripetal force and the vector of the centrifugal term are at every distance from the center equal to each other in magnitude and opposite in direction, so those two terms drop away against each other.
It is only in very special circumstances that the vector of the centripetal force and the centrifugal term drop away against each other at every distance from the center of rotation. This is the case if and only if the centripetal force is a harmonic force.
In this case, only the Coriolis term remains in the equation of motion.

$$\mathbf{F} = 2 m (\boldsymbol{\Omega} \times \mathbf{v})$$

Since the vector of the Coriolis term always points perpendicular to the velocity with respect to the rotating coordinate system, it follows that in the case of a restoring force that is a harmonic force, the eccentricity in the trajectory will show up as a small circular motion with respect to the rotating coordinate system. The factor 2 of the Coriolis term corresponds to a period of revolution that is half the period of the overall motion.

As expected, the analysis using vector notation results in a straight confirmation of the previous analysis:
The spring is continuously doing work. More precisely, the spring is oscillating between doing positive work (increasing the weight's kinetic energy) and doing negative work (decreasing the weight's kinetic energy).

== Conservation of angular momentum ==
In the earlier section titled 'Energy conversions', the dynamics is followed by keeping track of the energy conversions. The increase of angular velocity on contraction is in accordance with the principle of conservation of angular momentum. Since there is no torque acting on the circling weights, angular momentum is conserved. However, this disregards the causal mechanism, which is the force of the extended spring, and the work done during its contraction and extension. Similarly, when a cannon is fired, the projectile will shoot out of the barrel toward the target, and the barrel will recoil, in accordance with the principle of conservation of momentum. This does not mean that the projectile leaves the barrel at high velocity because the barrel recoils. While recoil of the barrel must occur, as described by Newton's third law, it is not a causal agent.

The causal mechanism is in the energy conversions: the explosion of the gunpowder converts potential chemical energy to the potential energy of a highly compressed gas. As the gas expands, its high pressure exerts a force on both the projectile and the interior of the barrel. It is through the action of that force that potential energy is converted to kinetic energy of both projectile and barrel.

In the case of rotational-vibrational coupling, the causal agent is the force exerted by the spring. The spring is oscillating between doing work and doing negative work. (The work is taken to be negative when the direction of the force is opposite to the direction of the motion.)

== See also ==
- Rotational–vibrational spectroscopy
