= Newton–Euler equations =

Rigid body equations in classical mechanics

In classical mechanics, the Newton–Euler equations describe the combined translational and rotational dynamics of a rigid body.

Traditionally the Newton–Euler equations is the grouping together of Euler's two laws of motion for a rigid body into a single equation with 6 components, using column vectors and matrices. These laws relate the motion of the center of gravity of a rigid body with the sum of forces and torques (or synonymously moments) acting on the rigid body.

== Center of mass frame ==
With respect to a coordinate frame whose origin coincides with the body's center of mass for τ(torque) and an inertial frame of reference for F(force), they can be expressed in matrix form as:

$$\left(\begin{matrix} {\mathbf F} \\ {\boldsymbol \tau} \end{matrix}\right) =
\left(\begin{matrix} m {\mathbf I_3} & 0 \\ 0 & {\mathbf I}_{\rm cm} \end{matrix}\right)
\left(\begin{matrix} \mathbf a_{\rm cm} \\ {\boldsymbol \alpha} \end{matrix}\right) +
\left(\begin{matrix} 0 \\ {\boldsymbol \omega} \times \left({\mathbf I}_{\rm cm} \, {\boldsymbol \omega}\right) \end{matrix}\right),$$

where

F = total force acting on the center of mass
m = mass of the body
I_{3} = the 3×3 identity matrix
a_{cm} = acceleration of the center of mass
v_{cm} = velocity of the center of mass
τ = total torque acting about the center of mass
I_{cm} = moment of inertia about the center of mass
ω = angular velocity of the body
α = angular acceleration of the body

== Arbitrary reference frame ==
With respect to a coordinate frame located at point P that is fixed in the body and not coincident with the center of mass, the equations assume the more complex form:

$$\left(\begin{matrix} {\mathbf F} \\ {\boldsymbol \tau}_{\rm p} \end{matrix}\right) =
\left(\begin{matrix} m {\mathbf I_3} &  -m [{\mathbf c}]^{\times}\\
m [{\mathbf c}]^{\times} & {\mathbf I}_{\rm cm} - m[{\mathbf c}]^{\times}[{\mathbf c}]^{\times}\end{matrix}\right)
\left(\begin{matrix} \mathbf a_{\rm p} \\ {\boldsymbol \alpha} \end{matrix}\right) +
\left(\begin{matrix} m[{\boldsymbol \omega}]^{\times}[{\boldsymbol \omega}]^{\times} {\mathbf c} \\
{[\boldsymbol \omega]}^\times ({\mathbf I}_{\rm cm} - m [{\mathbf c}]^\times[{\mathbf c}]^\times)\, {\boldsymbol \omega} \end{matrix}\right),$$

where c is the vector from P to the center of mass of the body expressed in the body-fixed frame, and

$$[\mathbf{c}]^{\times} \equiv
\left(\begin{matrix} 0 & -c_z & c_y \\ c_z & 0 & -c_x \\ -c_y & c_x & 0 \end{matrix}\right)
\qquad \qquad
[\mathbf{\boldsymbol{\omega}}]^{\times} \equiv
\left(\begin{matrix} 0 & -\omega_z & \omega_y \\ \omega_z & 0 & -\omega_x \\ -\omega_y & \omega_x & 0 \end{matrix}\right)$$

denote skew-symmetric cross product matrices.

The left hand side of the equation—which includes the sum of external forces, and the sum of external moments about P—describes a spatial wrench, see screw theory.

The inertial terms are contained in the spatial inertia matrix

$$\left(\begin{matrix} m {\mathbf I_3} & - m [{\mathbf c}]^{\times}\\
m [{\mathbf c}]^{\times} & {\mathbf I}_{\rm cm} - m [{\mathbf c}]^{\times}[{\mathbf c}]^{\times}\end{matrix}\right),$$

while the fictitious forces are contained in the term:

$$\left(\begin{matrix} m{[\boldsymbol \omega]}^\times {[\boldsymbol \omega]}^\times {\mathbf c} \\
{[\boldsymbol \omega]}^\times ({\mathbf I}_{\rm cm} - m [{\mathbf c}]^\times[{\mathbf c}]^\times)\, {\boldsymbol \omega} \end{matrix}\right) .$$

When the center of mass is not coincident with the coordinate frame (that is, when c is nonzero), the translational and angular accelerations (a and α) are coupled, so that each is associated with force and torque components.

== Applications ==
The Newton–Euler equations are used as the basis for more complicated "multi-body" formulations (screw theory) that describe the dynamics of systems of rigid bodies connected by joints and other constraints. Multi-body problems can be solved by a variety of numerical algorithms.

== See also ==
- Euler's laws of motion for a rigid body.
- Euler angles
- Inverse dynamics
- Centrifugal force
- Principal axes
- Spatial acceleration
- Screw theory of rigid body motion.
