= Inverse dynamics =

Inverse dynamics is an inverse problem in classical dynamics. Inverse rigid-body dynamics is a method for computing forces and/or moments of force (torques) based on the kinematics (motion) of a body and the body's inertial properties (mass and moment of inertia). Typically it uses link-segment models to represent the mechanical behaviour of interconnected segments, such as the limbs of humans or animals or the joint extensions of robots, where given the kinematics of the various parts, inverse dynamics derives the minimum forces and moments responsible for the individual movements. In practice, inverse dynamics computes these internal moments and forces from measurements of the motion of limbs and external forces such as ground reaction forces, under a special set of assumptions. It may also refer to inverse structural dynamics.

== Applications ==
The fields of robotics and biomechanics constitute the major application areas for inverse dynamics.

Within robotics, inverse dynamics algorithms are used to calculate the torques that a robot's motors must deliver to make the robot's end-point move in the way prescribed by its current task. The "inverse dynamics problem" for robotics was solved by Eduardo Bayo in 1987. This solution calculates how each of the numerous electric motors that control a robot arm must move to produce a particular action. Humans can perform very complicated and precise movements, such as controlling the tip of a fishing rod well enough to cast the bait accurately. Before the arm moves, the brain calculates the necessary movement of each muscle involved and tells the muscles what to do as the arm swings. In the case of a robot arm, the "muscles" are the electric motors which must turn by a given amount at a given moment. Each motor must be supplied with just the right amount of electric current, at just the right time. Researchers can predict the motion of a robot arm if they know how the motors will move. This is known as the forward dynamics problem. Until this discovery, they had not been able to work backwards to calculate the movements of the motors required to generate a particular complicated motion. Bayo's work began with the application of frequency-domain methods to the inverse dynamics of single-link flexible robots. This approach yielded non-causal exact solutions due to the right-half plane zeros in the hub-torque-to-tip transfer functions. Extending this method to the nonlinear multi-flexible-link case was of particular importance to robotics. When combined with passive joint control in a collaborative effort with a control group, Bayo's inverse dynamics approach led to exponentially stable tip-tracking control for flexible multi-link robots.

Similarly, inverse dynamics in biomechanics computes the net turning effect of all the anatomical structures across a joint, in particular the muscles and ligaments, necessary to produce the observed motions of the joint. These moments of force may then be used to compute the amount of mechanical work performed by that moment of force. Each moment of force can perform positive work to increase the speed and/or height of the body or perform negative work to decrease the speed and/or height of the body. The equations of motion necessary for these computations are based on Newtonian mechanics, specifically the Newton–Euler equations of:

Force equal mass times linear acceleration, and
Moment equals mass moment of inertia times angular acceleration.

These equations mathematically model the behavior of a limb in terms of a knowledge domain-independent, link-segment model, such as idealized solids of revolution or a skeleton with fixed-length limbs and perfect pivot joints. From these equations, inverse dynamics derives the torque (moment) level at each joint based on the movement of the attached limb or limbs affected by the joint. This process used to derive the joint moments is known as inverse dynamics because it reverses the forward dynamics equations of motion, the set of differential equations which yield the position and angle trajectories of the idealized skeleton's limbs from the accelerations and forces applied.

From joint moments, a biomechanist could infer muscle forces that would lead to those moments based on a model of bone and muscle attachments, etc., thereby estimating muscle activation from kinematic motion.

Correctly computing force (or moment) values from inverse dynamics can be challenging because external forces (e.g., ground contact forces) affect motion but are not directly observable from the kinematic motion. In addition, co-activation of muscles can lead to a family of solutions which are not distinguishable from the kinematic motion's characteristics. Furthermore, closed kinematic chains, such as swinging a bat or shooting a hockey puck, require the measurement of internal forces (in the bat or stick) be made before shoulder, elbow or wrist moments and forces can be derived.

== See also ==
- Kinematics
- Inverse kinematics: a problem similar to Inverse dynamics but with different goals and starting assumptions. While inverse dynamics asks for torques that produce a certain time-trajectory of positions and velocities, inverse kinematics only asks for a static set of joint angles such that a certain point (or a set of points) of the character (or robot) is positioned at a certain designated location. It is used in synthesizing the appearance of human motion, particularly in the field of video game design. Another use is in robotics, where joint angles of an arm must be calculated from the desired position of the end effector.
- Body segment parameters
