= Spatial acceleration =

In physics, the study of rigid body motion allows for several ways to define the acceleration of a body. The usual definition of acceleration entails following a single particle/point of a rigid body and observing its changes in velocity. Spatial acceleration entails looking at a fixed (unmoving) point in space and observing the change in velocity of the particles that pass through that point. This is similar to the definition of acceleration in fluid dynamics, where typically one measures velocity and/or acceleration at a fixed point inside a testing apparatus.

== Definition ==
Consider a moving rigid body and the velocity of a point P on the body being a function of the position and velocity of a center-point C and the angular velocity $\boldsymbol \omega$.

The linear velocity vector $\mathbf v_P$ at P is expressed in terms of the velocity vector $\mathbf v_C$ at C as:

$\mathbf v_P = \mathbf v_C + \boldsymbol \omega \times (\mathbf r_P - \mathbf r_C)$

where $\boldsymbol \omega$ is the angular velocity vector.

The material acceleration at P is:

$\mathbf a_P = \frac{d \mathbf v_P}{dt} = \mathbf a_C + \boldsymbol \alpha \times (\mathbf r_P - \mathbf r_C) + \boldsymbol \omega \times (\mathbf v_P - \mathbf v_C)$

where $\boldsymbol \alpha$ is the angular acceleration vector.

The spatial acceleration $\boldsymbol \psi_P$ at P is expressed in terms of the spatial acceleration $\boldsymbol \psi_C$ at C as:

$$\begin{align}
\boldsymbol \psi_P &= \frac{\partial \mathbf v_P}{\partial t} \\[1ex]
&= \boldsymbol \psi_{C} + \boldsymbol \alpha \times (\mathbf{r}_{P} - \mathbf{r}_{C})
\end{align}$$

which is similar to the velocity transformation above.

In general the spatial acceleration $\boldsymbol \psi_P$ of a particle point P that is moving with linear velocity $\mathbf v_P$ is derived from the material acceleration $\mathbf a_P$ at P as:

$\boldsymbol{\psi}_{P} = \mathbf{a}_{P} - \boldsymbol{\omega} \times \mathbf{v}_{P}$
