= Torricelli's equation =

Physics equation for velocity

In physics, Torricelli's equation, or Torricelli's formula, is an equation created by Evangelista Torricelli to find the final velocity of a moving object with constant acceleration along an axis (for example, the x axis) without having a known time interval.

The equation itself is
$$v_\text{f}^2 = v_\text{i}^2 + 2a\Delta x,$$
where

$v_\text{f}$ is the object's final velocity along the x axis on which the acceleration is constant,
$v_\text{i}$ is the object's initial velocity along the x axis,
$a$ is the object's acceleration along the x axis, which is given as a constant,
$\Delta x$ is the object's change in position along the x axis, also called displacement.

In this and all subsequent equations in this article, the subscript $x$ (as in ${v_\text{f}}_x$) is implied, but is not expressed explicitly for clarity in presenting the equations.

This equation is valid along any axis on which the acceleration is constant.

== Derivation ==
=== Without differentials and integration ===
Begin with the following relations for the case of uniform acceleration:

$$x_\text{f} - x_\text{i} = v_\text{i}t + \tfrac{1}{2}at^2$$	1

$$v_\text{f} - v_\text{i} = at$$	2

Take (1), and multiply both sides with acceleration $a$

$$a(x_\text{f} - x_\text{i}) = av_\text{i}t + \tfrac{1}{2}a^2t^2$$	3

The following rearrangement of the right hand side makes it easier to recognize the coming substitution:

$$a(x_\text{f} - x_\text{i}) = v_\text{i}(at) + \tfrac{1}{2}(at)^2$$	4

Use (2) to substitute the product $at$:

$$a(x_\text{f} - x_\text{i}) = v_\text{i} (v_\text{f} - v_\text{i}) + \tfrac{1}{2}(v_\text{f} - v_\text{i})^2$$	5

Work out the multiplications:

$$a(x_\text{f} - x_\text{i}) = v_\text{i} v_\text{f} - v_\text{i}^2 + \tfrac{1}{2}v_\text{f}^2 - v_\text{i} v_\text{f} + \tfrac{1}{2}v_\text{i}^2$$	6

The crossterms $v_\text{i}v_\text{f}$ drop away against each other, leaving only squared terms:

$$a(x_\text{f} - x_\text{i}) = \tfrac{1}{2}v_\text{f}^2 - \tfrac{1}{2}v_\text{i}^2$$	7

(7) rearranges to the form of Torricelli's equation as presented at the start of the article:

$$v_\text{f}^2 = v_\text{i}^2 + 2a\Delta x$$	8

=== Using differentials and integration ===
Begin with the definitions of velocity as the derivative of the position, and acceleration as the derivative of the velocity:

$$v = \frac{dx}{dt}$$	9

$$a = \frac{dv}{dt}$$	10

Set up integration from initial position $x_\text{i}$ to final position $x_\text{f}$

$$\int_{x_\text{i}}^{x_\text{f}}a\,dx$$	11

In accordance with (9) we can substitute $dx$ with $v\,dt$, with corresponding change of limits.

$$\int_{t_\text{i}}^{t_\text{f}} a\,v\,dt$$	12

Here changing the order of $a$ and $v$ makes it easier to recognize the upcoming substitution.

$$\int_{t_\text{i}}^{t_\text{f}} v\,a\,dt$$	13

In accordance with (10) we can substitute $a\,dt$ with $dv$, with corresponding change of limits.

$$\int_{v_\text{i}}^{v_\text{f}} v\,dv$$	14

So we have:

$$\int_{x_\text{i}}^{x_\text{f}} a\,dx=\int_{v_\text{i}}^{v_\text{f}}v\,dv$$	15

Since the acceleration is constant, we can factor it out of the integration:

$$a\int_{x_\text{i}}^{x_\text{f}}dx=\int_{v_\text{i}}^{v_\text{f}}v\,dv$$	16

Evaluating the integration:

$$a x\Big|_{x=x_\text{i}}^{x=x_\text{f}} = \tfrac{1}{2} v^2 \Big|_{v=v_\text{i}}^{v=v_\text{f}}$$	17

$$a \left(x_\text{f} - x_\text{i}\right) = \tfrac{1}{2} \left(v_\text{f}^2 - v_\text{i}^2\right)$$	18

The factor $x_\text{f}-x_\text{i}$ is the displacement $\Delta x$:

$$2a\Delta x=v_\text{f}^2-v_\text{i}^2$$	19

$$v_\text{f}^2=v_\text{i}^2+2a\Delta x$$	20

== Application ==
Combining Torricelli's equation with $F=ma$ gives the work-energy theorem.

Torricelli's equation and the generalization to non-uniform acceleration have the same form:

Repeat of (16):

$$\int_{x_\text{i}}^{x_\text{f}}a\,dx=\int_{v_\text{i}}^{v_\text{f}}v\,dv$$	21

Evaluating the right hand side:

$$\int_{x_\text{i}}^{x_\text{f}} a\,dx=\tfrac{1}{2}v_\text{f}^2 - \tfrac{1}{2}v_\text{i}^2$$	22

To compare with Torricelli's equation: repeat of (7):

$$a(x_\text{f} - x_\text{i}) = \tfrac{1}{2}v_\text{f}^2 - \tfrac{1}{2}v_\text{i}^2$$	23

To derive the work-energy theorem: start with $F=ma$ and on both sides state the integral with respect to the position coordinate. If both sides are integrable then the resulting expression is valid:

$$\int_{x_\text{i}}^{x_\text{f}} F\,dx = \int_{x_\text{i}}^{x_\text{f}} ma\,dx$$	24

Use (22) to process the right hand side:

$$\int_{x_\text{i}}^{x_\text{f}} F\,dx = \tfrac{1}{2}mv_\text{f}^2 - \tfrac{1}{2}mv_\text{i}^2$$	25

The reason that the right hand sides of (22) and (23) are the same:

First consider the case with two consecutive stages of different uniform acceleration, first from $s_0$ to $s_1$, and then from $s_1$ to $s_2$.

Expressions for each of the two stages:

$$a_1(s_1-s_0) = \tfrac{1}{2}v_1^2 - \tfrac{1}{2}v_0^2$$
$$a_2(s_2-s_1) = \tfrac{1}{2}v_2^2 - \tfrac{1}{2}v_1^2$$

Since these expressions are for consecutive intervals they can be added; the result is a valid expression.

Upon addition the intermediate term $\tfrac{1}{2}v_1^2$ drops out; only the outer terms $\tfrac{1}{2}v_2^2$ and $\tfrac{1}{2}v_0^2$ remain:

$$a_1(s_1-s_0) + a_2(s_2-s_1) = \tfrac{1}{2}v_2^2 - \tfrac{1}{2}v_0^2$$	26

The above result generalizes: the total distance can be subdivided into any number of subdivisions; after adding everything together only the outer terms remain; all of the intermediate terms drop out.

The generalization of (26) to an arbitrary number of subdivisions of the total interval from $s_0$ to $s_n$ can be expressed as a summation:

$$\sum_{i=1}^n a_\text{i}(s_\text{i} - s_{i-1}) = \tfrac{1}{2}v_n^2 - \tfrac{1}{2}v_{i-1}^2$$	27

== See also ==
- Equation of motion
