= Rigid body =

Physical object which does not deform when forces or moments are exerted on it

The position of a rigid body is determined by the position of its center of mass and by its attitude (at least six parameters in total).

In classical mechanics, a rigid body, also known as a rigid object, is a solid body in which deformation is zero or negligible, when a deforming pressure or deforming force is applied on it. The distance between any two given points on a rigid body remains constant in time regardless of external forces or moments exerted on it. A rigid body is usually considered as a continuous distribution of mass. Mechanics of rigid bodies is a field within mechanics where motions and forces of objects are studied without considering effects that can cause deformation (as opposed to mechanics of materials, where deformable objects are considered).

In the study of special relativity, a perfectly rigid body does not exist; and objects can only be assumed to be rigid if they are not moving near the speed of light, where the mass is infinitely large. In quantum mechanics, a rigid body is usually thought of as a collection of point masses. For instance, molecules (consisting of the point masses: electrons and nuclei) are often seen as rigid bodies (see classification of molecules as rigid rotors).

== Principles ==
=== Linear and angular position ===
The position of a rigid body is the position of all the particles of which it is composed. To simplify the description of this position, we exploit the property that the body is rigid, namely that all its particles maintain the same distance relative to each other. If the body is rigid, it is sufficient to describe the position of at least three non-collinear particles. This makes it possible to reconstruct the position of all the other particles, provided that their time-invariant position relative to the three selected particles is known. However, typically a different, mathematically more convenient, but equivalent approach is used. The position of the whole body is represented by:

1. the linear position or position of the body, namely the position of one of the particles of the body, specifically chosen as a reference point (typically coinciding with the center of mass or centroid of the body), together with
2. the angular position (also known as orientation, or attitude) of the body.

Thus, the position of a rigid body has two components: linear and angular, respectively. The same is true for other kinematic and kinetic quantities describing the motion of a rigid body, such as linear and angular velocity, acceleration, momentum, impulse, and kinetic energy.

The linear position can be represented by a vector with its tail at an arbitrary reference point in space (the origin of a chosen coordinate system) and its tip at an arbitrary point of interest on the rigid body, typically coinciding with its center of mass or centroid. This reference point may define the origin of a coordinate system fixed to the body.

There are several ways to numerically describe the orientation of a rigid body, including a set of three Euler angles, a quaternion, or a direction cosine matrix (also referred to as a rotation matrix). All these methods actually define the orientation of a basis set (or coordinate system) which has a fixed orientation relative to the body (i.e. rotates together with the body), relative to another basis set (or coordinate system), from which the motion of the rigid body is observed. For instance, a basis set with fixed orientation relative to an airplane can be defined as a set of three orthogonal unit vectors b_{1}, b_{2}, b_{3}, such that b_{1} is parallel to the chord line of the wing and directed forward, b_{2} is normal to the plane of symmetry and directed rightward, and b_{3} is given by the cross product $b_3 = b_1 \times b_2$.

In general, when a rigid body moves, both its position and orientation vary with time. In the kinematic sense, these changes are referred to as translation and rotation, respectively. Indeed, the position of a rigid body can be viewed as a hypothetic translation and rotation (roto-translation) of the body starting from a hypothetic reference position (not necessarily coinciding with a position actually taken by the body during its motion).

=== Linear and angular velocity ===
Velocity (also called linear velocity) and angular velocity are measured with respect to a frame of reference.

The linear velocity of a rigid body is a vector quantity, equal to the time rate of change of its linear position. Thus, it is the velocity of a reference point fixed to the body. During purely translational motion (motion with no rotation), all points on a rigid body move with the same velocity. However, when motion involves rotation, the instantaneous velocity of any two points on the body will generally not be the same. Two points of a rotating body will have the same instantaneous velocity only if they happen to lie on an axis parallel to the instantaneous axis of rotation.

Angular velocity is a vector quantity that describes the angular speed at which the orientation of the rigid body is changing and the instantaneous axis about which it is rotating (the existence of this instantaneous axis is guaranteed by the Euler's rotation theorem). All points on a rigid body experience the same angular velocity at all times. During purely rotational motion, all points on the body change position except for those lying on the instantaneous axis of rotation. The relationship between orientation and angular velocity is not directly analogous to the relationship between position and velocity. Angular velocity is not the time rate of change of orientation, because there is no such concept as an orientation vector that can be differentiated to obtain the angular velocity.

== Kinematical equations ==
=== Addition theorem for angular velocity ===
The angular velocity of a rigid body B in a reference frame N is equal to the sum of the angular velocity of a rigid body D in N and the angular velocity of B with respect to D:

$${}^\mathrm{N}\!\boldsymbol{\omega}^\mathrm{B} = {}^\mathrm{N}\!\boldsymbol{\omega}^\mathrm{D} + {}^\mathrm{D}\!\boldsymbol{\omega}^\mathrm{B}.$$

In this case, rigid bodies and reference frames are indistinguishable and completely interchangeable.

=== Addition theorem for position ===
For any set of three points P, Q, and R, the position vector from P to R is the sum of the position vector from P to Q and the position vector from Q to R:

$$\mathbf{r}^\mathrm{PR} = \mathbf{r}^\mathrm{PQ} + \mathbf{r}^\mathrm{QR}.$$

The norm of a position vector is the spatial distance. Here the coordinates of all three vectors must be expressed in coordinate frames with the same orientation.

=== Mathematical definition of velocity ===
The velocity of point P in reference frame N is defined as the time derivative in N of the position vector from O to P:

$${}^\mathrm{N}\mathbf{v}^\mathrm{P} = \frac{{}^\mathrm{N}\mathrm{d}}{\mathrm{d}t}(\mathbf{r}^\mathrm{OP})$$

where O is any arbitrary point fixed in reference frame N, and the N to the left of the d/dt operator indicates that the derivative is taken in reference frame N. The result is independent of the selection of O so long as O is fixed in N.

=== Mathematical definition of acceleration ===
The acceleration of point P in reference frame N is defined as the time derivative in N of its velocity:

$${}^\mathrm{N}\mathbf{a}^\mathrm{P} = \frac{^\mathrm{N}\mathrm{d}}{\mathrm{d}t} ({}^\mathrm{N}\mathbf{v}^\mathrm{P}).$$

=== Velocity of two points fixed on a rigid body ===
For two points P and Q that are fixed on a rigid body B, where B has an angular velocity $\scriptstyle{^\mathrm{N}\boldsymbol{\omega}^\mathrm{B}}$ in the reference frame N, the velocity of Q in N can be expressed as a function of the velocity of P in N:

$${}^\mathrm{N}\mathbf{v}^\mathrm{Q} = {}^\mathrm{N}\!\mathbf{v}^\mathrm{P} + {}^\mathrm{N}\boldsymbol{\omega}^\mathrm{B} \times \mathbf{r}^\mathrm{PQ}.$$

where $\mathbf{r}^\mathrm{PQ}$ is the position vector from P to Q., with coordinates expressed in N (or a frame with the same orientation as N.) This relation can be derived from the temporal invariance of the norm distance between P and Q.

=== Acceleration of two points fixed on a rigid body ===
By differentiating the equation for the Velocity of two points fixed on a rigid body in N with respect to time, the acceleration in reference frame N of a point Q fixed on a rigid body B can be expressed as

$${}^\mathrm{N}\mathbf{a}^\mathrm{Q} = {}^\mathrm{N}\mathbf{a}^\mathrm{P} + {}^\mathrm{N}\boldsymbol{\omega}^\mathrm{B} \times \left( {}^\mathrm{N}\boldsymbol{\omega}^\mathrm{B} \times \mathbf{r}^\mathrm{PQ} \right) + {}^\mathrm{N}\boldsymbol{\alpha}^\mathrm{B} \times \mathbf{r}^\mathrm{PQ}$$

where $\scriptstyle{{}^\mathrm{N}\!\boldsymbol{\alpha}^\mathrm{B}}$ is the angular acceleration of B in the reference frame N.

=== Angular velocity and acceleration of two points fixed on a rigid body ===
As mentioned above, all points on a rigid body B have the same angular velocity ${}^\mathrm{N}\boldsymbol{\omega}^\mathrm{B}$ in a fixed reference frame N, and thus the same angular acceleration ${}^\mathrm{N}\boldsymbol{\alpha}^\mathrm{B}.$

=== Velocity of one point moving on a rigid body ===
If the point R is moving in the rigid body B while B moves in reference frame N, then the velocity of R in N is

$${}^\mathrm{N}\mathbf{v}^\mathrm{R} = {}^\mathrm{N}\mathbf{v}^\mathrm{Q} + {}^\mathrm{B}\mathbf{v}^\mathrm{R}$$

where Q is the point fixed in B that is instantaneously coincident with R at the instant of interest. This relation is often combined with the relation for the Velocity of two points fixed on a rigid body.

=== Acceleration of one point moving on a rigid body ===
The acceleration in reference frame N of the point R moving in body B while B is moving in frame N is given by

$${}^\mathrm{N}\mathbf{a}^\mathrm{R} = {}^\mathrm{N}\mathbf{a}^\mathrm{Q} + {}^\mathrm{B}\mathbf{a}^\mathrm{R} + 2 {}^\mathrm{N}\boldsymbol{\omega}^\mathrm{B} \times {}^\mathrm{B}\mathbf{v}^\mathrm{R}$$

where Q is the point fixed in B that instantaneously coincident with R at the instant of interest. This equation is often combined with Acceleration of two points fixed on a rigid body.

=== Other quantities ===
If C is the origin of a local coordinate system L, attached to the body, the spatial or twist acceleration of a rigid body is defined as the spatial acceleration of C (as opposed to material acceleration above):
$$\boldsymbol\psi(t,\mathbf{r}_0) = \mathbf{a}(t,\mathbf{r}_0) - \boldsymbol\omega(t) \times \mathbf{v}(t,\mathbf{r}_0) = \boldsymbol\psi_c(t) + \boldsymbol\alpha(t) \times A(t) \mathbf{r}_0$$
where

- $\mathbf{r}_0$ represents the position of the point/particle with respect to the reference point of the body in terms of the local coordinate system L (the rigidity of the body means that this does not depend on time)
- $A(t)\,$ is the orientation matrix, an orthogonal matrix with determinant 1, representing the orientation (angular position) of the local coordinate system L, with respect to the arbitrary reference orientation of another coordinate system G. Think of this matrix as three orthogonal unit vectors, one in each column, which define the orientation of the axes of L with respect to G.
- $\boldsymbol\omega(t)$ represents the angular velocity of the rigid body
- $\mathbf{v}(t,\mathbf{r}_0)$ represents the total velocity of the point/particle
- $\mathbf{a}(t,\mathbf{r}_0)$ represents the total acceleration of the point/particle
- $\boldsymbol\alpha(t)$ represents the angular acceleration of the rigid body
- $\boldsymbol\psi(t,\mathbf{r}_0)$ represents the spatial acceleration of the point/particle
- $\boldsymbol\psi_c(t)$ represents the spatial acceleration of the rigid body (i.e. the spatial acceleration of the origin of L).

In 2D, the angular velocity is a scalar, and matrix A(t) simply represents a rotation in the xy-plane by an angle which is the integral of the angular velocity over time.

Vehicles, walking people, etc., usually rotate according to changes in the direction of the velocity: they move forward with respect to their own orientation. Then, if the body follows a closed orbit in a plane, the angular velocity integrated over a time interval in which the orbit is completed once, is an integer times 360°. This integer is the winding number with respect to the origin of the velocity. Compare the amount of rotation associated with the vertices of a polygon.

=== Instantaneous rotation axis formulae ===
Assume that $\mathbf v(\mathbf P)$ is a smooth 3-d vector field and $O$ is a point in $\mathbb R^3$, with $\mathbf v_O = \mathbf v(O)$. Denote $B_\varepsilon$ the ball of radius $\varepsilon$ centered at $O$, and $\mathbf r = \mathbf P - O$. We examine the expression $\mathbf I_\varepsilon = \int_{B_\epsilon} \frac{\mathbf r \times (\mathbf v(\mathbf P) - \mathbf v_O)}{r^2} \, dV.$

Linearizing the velocity field at $O$ gives $\mathbf v(\mathbf P) - \mathbf v_O = (\nabla \mathbf v)_O \, \mathbf r + o(r),$ where $(\nabla \mathbf v)_O$ is the Jacobian matrix at $O$.

Decompose it into symmetric and antisymmetric parts: $(\nabla \mathbf v)_O = J_s + J_a$, with $J_a$ antisymmetric. By linear algebra, there exists a vector $\boldsymbol{w}$ such that $J_a \mathbf r = \boldsymbol{w} \times \mathbf r$. In fact, direct computation shows that $\boldsymbol w = {1\over 2} \nabla \times \mathbf v(O)$. The symmetric part $J_s$ does not contribute to the integral, hence

$\mathbf I_\varepsilon = \int_{B_\varepsilon} \frac{\mathbf r \times (J_a \mathbf r)}{r^2} \, dV + o(\varepsilon^3) = \int_{B_\varepsilon} \frac{\mathbf r \times (\boldsymbol{w} \times \mathbf r)}{r^2} \, dV + o(\varepsilon^3).$

Using the triple product identity, there holds
$$\frac{\mathbf r \times (\boldsymbol{w} \times \mathbf r)}{r^2} = \boldsymbol{w} - \frac{(\mathbf r \cdot \boldsymbol{w}) \mathbf r}{r^2}.$$

Integrating over the ball and using spherical symmetry,
$$\int_{B_\varepsilon} \frac{(\mathbf r \cdot \boldsymbol{w}) \mathbf r}{r^2} \, dV = \frac{1}{3} \text{Vol}(B_\varepsilon) \boldsymbol{w},$$
so that
$$\mathbf I_\varepsilon = \frac{2}{3} \text{Vol}(B_\varepsilon) \boldsymbol{w} + o(\varepsilon^3),
\quad {\rm with} \quad \boldsymbol w = {1\over 2} \nabla \times \mathbf v(O).\quad (*)$$

Incidentally, this formula provides an integral formulation of the curl of the vector field at $O$:
$$\nabla \times \mathbf v(O) =
\lim_{\varepsilon \to 0}  {3\over \text{Vol}(B_\varepsilon)} \int_{B_\epsilon} \frac{\mathbf r \times (\mathbf v(\mathbf P) - \mathbf v_O)}{r^2} \, dV.$$

==== Coordinate free formula for the instantaneous rotation vector ====
Now, assume a rigid body is rotating with angular velocity $\boldsymbol{\omega}$. By rigid body kinematics, using the notations above, the field of velocities is given at every time $t$ by
$$\mathbf v(\mathbf P) = \mathbf v_O + \boldsymbol{\omega} \times \mathbf r.$$
Thus, the vector field $\mathbf v(\mathbf \mathbf P) - \mathbf v_O$ is linear in $\mathbf r$. It follows that $(\nabla \mathbf v)_O \, \mathbf r = \boldsymbol\omega \times \mathbf r = J_a$. Thus $\boldsymbol\omega = \boldsymbol w$ and the terms $o(r)$ and $o(\varepsilon^3)$ vanish identically in the above formulae. Therefore $(*)$ implies
$$\mathbf I_\varepsilon =  \frac{2}{3} \mathrm{Vol}(B_\varepsilon)\, \boldsymbol{\omega}.$$
Solving for $\boldsymbol{\omega}$ yields, for every ball $B_\varepsilon$ centered at $O$,
$$\boldsymbol{\omega} = \frac{3}{2\,\mathrm{Vol}(B_\varepsilon)} \int_{B_\varepsilon}
\frac{\mathbf r \times (\mathbf v(\mathbf P) - \mathbf v_O)}{r^2} \, dV.$$

==== Curl formula ====
From $(*)$ and the fact that $o(\varepsilon^3)$ vanishes identically (as seen just above), the curl formula follows:
$$\boldsymbol{\omega} = \frac{1}{2} \nabla \times \mathbf v(O).$$

== Kinetics ==
Any point that is rigidly connected to the body can be used as reference point (origin of coordinate system L) to describe the linear motion of the body (the linear position, velocity and acceleration vectors depend on the choice).

However, depending on the application, a convenient choice may be:

- the center of mass of the whole system, which generally has the simplest motion for a body moving freely in space;
- a point such that the translational motion is zero or simplified, e.g. on an axle or hinge, at the center of a ball and socket joint, etc.

When the center of mass is used as reference point:

- The (linear) momentum is independent of the rotational motion. At any time it is equal to the total mass of the rigid body times the translational velocity.
- The angular momentum with respect to the center of mass is the same as without translation: at any time it is equal to the inertia tensor times the angular velocity. When the angular velocity is expressed with respect to a coordinate system coinciding with the principal axes of the body, each component of the angular momentum is a product of a moment of inertia (a principal value of the inertia tensor) times the corresponding component of the angular velocity; the torque is the inertia tensor times the angular acceleration.
- Possible motions in the absence of external forces are translation with constant velocity, steady rotation about a fixed principal axis, and also torque-free precession.
- The net external force on the rigid body is always equal to the total mass times the translational acceleration (i.e., Newton's second law holds for the translational motion, even when the net external torque is nonzero, and/or the body rotates).
- The total kinetic energy is simply the sum of translational and rotational energy.

== Geometry ==
Two rigid bodies are said to be different (not copies) if there is no proper rotation from one to the other. A rigid body is called chiral if its mirror image is different in that sense, i.e., if it has either no symmetry or its symmetry group contains only proper rotations. In the opposite case an object is called achiral: the mirror image is a copy, not a different object. Such an object may have a symmetry plane, but not necessarily: there may also be a plane of reflection with respect to which the image of the object is a rotated version. The latter applies for S_{2n}, of which the case n = 1 is inversion symmetry.

For a (rigid) rectangular transparent sheet, inversion symmetry corresponds to having on one side an image without rotational symmetry and on the other side an image such that what shines through is the image at the top side, upside down. We can distinguish two cases:

- the sheet surface with the image is not symmetric - in this case the two sides are different, but the mirror image of the object is the same, after a rotation by 180° about the axis perpendicular to the mirror plane.
- the sheet surface with the image has a symmetry axis - in this case the two sides are the same, and the mirror image of the object is also the same, again after a rotation by 180° about the axis perpendicular to the mirror plane.

A sheet with a through and through image is achiral. We can distinguish again two cases:

- the sheet surface with the image has no symmetry axis - the two sides are different
- the sheet surface with the image has a symmetry axis - the two sides are the same

== Configuration space ==
The configuration space of a rigid body with one point fixed (i.e., a body with zero translational motion) is given by the underlying manifold of the rotation group SO(3). The configuration space of a nonfixed (with non-zero translational motion) rigid body is E^{+}(3), the subgroup of direct isometries of the Euclidean group in three dimensions (combinations of translations and rotations).

== See also ==
- Angular velocity
- Axes conventions
- Born rigidity
- Classical Mechanics (Goldstein)
- Differential rotation
- Euler's equations (rigid body dynamics)
- Euler's laws
- Geometric Mechanics
- Rigid body dynamics
- Rigid rotor
- Rigid transformation
- Infinitesimal rotations
- Solid mechanics
