= Carl Eckart =

American geophysicist and administrator (1902–1973)

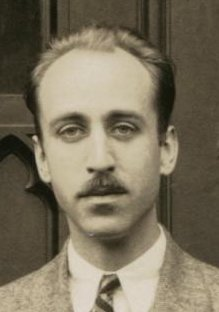
- Born: May 4, 1902; St. Louis, Missouri, U.S.
- Died: October 23, 1973 (aged 71); La Jolla, California
- Education: Washington University in St. Louis (BS, MS); Princeton University (PhD)
- Known for: Wigner–Eckart theorem Eckart–Young theorem Eckart conditions Eckart streaming Eckart profile
- Spouse: Klára Dán von Neumann
- Awards: Elected to National Academy of Sciences; Guggenheim Fellowship; Alexander Agassiz Medal 1966; William Bowie Medal 1972
- Scientific career
- Fields: physics physical oceanography geophysics
- Workplaces: University of Chicago; University of California, San Diego

Carl Henry Eckart (May 4, 1902 – October 23, 1973) was an American physicist, physical oceanographer, geophysicist, and administrator. He co-developed the Wigner–Eckart theorem and is also known for the Eckart conditions in quantum mechanics, the Eckart–Young theorem in linear algebra, and his work on non-equilibrium thermodynamics and continuum mechanics, including a relativistic treatment.

== Early life ==
Eckart was born an only child in St. Louis, Missouri, to a conservative family of German descent. He began college in 1919 at Washington University in St. Louis where he received his B.S. and M.S. degrees with a major in engineering from the School of Engineering. Due to Arthur Compton, a physics faculty member and later Chancellor, Eckart was influenced to continue his education in physics at Princeton University, where he went in 1923 on an Edison Lamp Works Research Fellowship. Eckart was awarded his Ph.D. in 1925.

During his graduate studies, Eckart co-authored a paper with Karl Compton, brother of Arthur Compton, on low-voltage arcs, particularly the oscillatory phenomena arising in the diffusion of electrons against low-voltage fields. He continued this line of work after receipt of his Ph.D. on a National Research Council Fellowship at the California Institute of Technology (Caltech) during the period 1925 to 1927. Max Born, director of the Institute for Theoretical Physics at the University of Göttingen and co-developer of the matrix mechanics formulation of quantum mechanics with Werner Heisenberg, came to Caltech in the winter of 1925 and gave a lecture on his work. Born's lecture gave Eckart the impetus to investigate the possible general operator formalism for quantum mechanics. Working into early 1926, Eckart developed the formalism. When Erwin Schrödinger's first paper in the series of four on the wave mechanics formulation of quantum mechanics was published in January, Eckart soon realized that the matrix formulation and wave formulation of quantum mechanics were equivalent; he submitted his paper to the Proceedings of the National Academy of Sciences of the United States of America for publication. However, it was communicated on May 31, 1926, and Schrödinger's paper on the equivalence was received on March 18, 1926, thus giving him credit for the realization.

In 1927 Eckart received a Guggenheim Fellowship to do postdoctoral study and research with Arnold Sommerfeld at the Ludwig-Maximilians-Universität München, one of the three main centers for the development of quantum mechanics, the others being Göttingen under Born and the University of Copenhagen under Niels Bohr. Also at Munich simultaneous with Eckart were Rudolf Peierls, and two other Guggenheim Fellows, Edwin C. Kemble and William V. Houston. In Munich, Eckart worked on the quantum mechanical behavior of simple oscillators using the Schrödinger equation and on operator calculus related to the matrix formulation of quantum mechanics. He also applied his work to the theory of electrons and the conductivity of metals using Fermi statistics, and he co-authored a paper on the subject with Sommerfeld and William V. Houston.

== Career ==
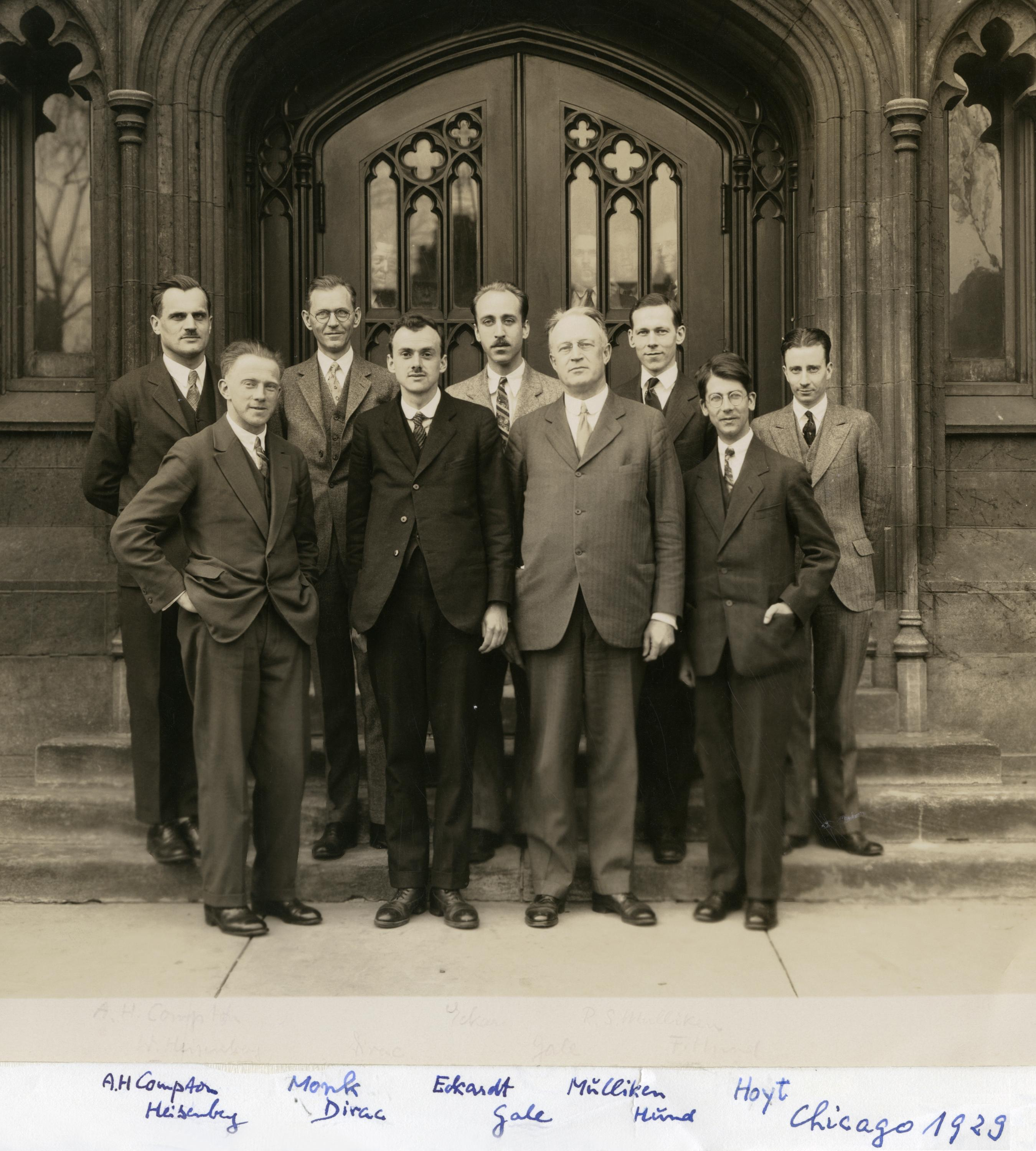
Arthur Compton, Werner Heisenberg, George S. Monk, Paul Dirac, Carl Eckart, Henry Gale, Robert Mulliken, Friedrich Hund, Frank C. Hoyt. Chicago 1929.

=== University of Chicago ===
Returning to the United States in 1928, Eckart was appointed assistant professor in the physics department at the University of Chicago, where he continued his work on quantum mechanics for another 14 years. Noteworthy was a paper co-authored with Helmut Hönl, who received his doctorate under Sommerfeld in 1926; the paper, on the foundations of quantum mechanics, dealt with the role of group theory in quantum dynamics in monatomic systems and comparisons of the nuclear theories of Werner Heisenberg and Eugene Wigner. During this period, Eckart developed his formulation of the Wigner-Eckart theorem – a link between symmetry transformation groups applied to the Schrödinger equation and the laws of conservation of energy, momentum, and angular momentum. The theorem is particularly useful in spectroscopy. With F. C. Hoyt, Eckart translated Heisenberg's book on the physical principles of quantum mechanics. During the 1934–1935 academic year, Eckart took a sabbatical at the Institute for Advanced Study in New Jersey, as he also did in the academic years 1952-1953 and 1960–1961. During this period he published, along with Gale Young, a proof of the Eckart-Young theorem, which solves the problem of least-squares approximation of a given matrix by a matrix of lower rank.

In December 1938 in Germany, Otto Hahn and Fritz Strassmann conducted an experiment which pointed towards the fission of uranium. They communicated their results to their former colleague Lise Meitner, who had fled Germany earlier in the year. In January 1939, Meitner and her nephew Otto Frisch correctly interpreted the experimental results as the fission of uranium. News of the discovery spread very rapidly. With the potential of making a fission-based atomic weapon and the threat of war in Europe, this caused anxiety in many, Leó Szilárd for example, that Germany would develop an atomic weapon. As a result of two meetings with Albert Einstein, the first with Szilárd and Eugene Wigner and the second with Szilárd and Edward Teller, Einstein signed the Einstein–Szilárd letter to President Franklin Delano Roosevelt (FDR) in August. World War II broke out in Europe in September. The letter was delivered to FDR in October by economist and banker Alexander Sachs. In response to the letter, the Uranium Committee was formed that month. The Theoretical Aspects Subsection, chaired by Enrico Fermi, was located at the University of Chicago, and Eckart was a member of it. However, in 1941, Eckart withdrew from the Committee because of his anti-atomic bomb sentiments. Also notable during this period are his papers on the thermodynamics of irreversible processes.

=== University of California, San Diego ===
With the entry of the United States into World War II in December 1941, there was increased incentive for the scientific community to participate in the war effort. Axis submarines were exacting a toll on allied shipping, and university scientists were being approached by the U. S. Navy concerning optical and acoustical detection of submarines. B. O. Knudsen, director of the newly formed University of California Division of War Research, and his associate L. P. Delsasso approached Eckart for help. Eckart (an associate professor) took leave from the University of Chicago to work on the problem, thus beginning his 31-year stay in California. From 1942, he was assistant director of the Division of War Research, and eventually he was director, a position he held until 1946.

In 1946, Eckart officially resigned his position at the University of Chicago to become a professor of geophysics at the Scripps Institution of Oceanography of the University of California, San Diego (UCSD), a position he held until 1971. In 1946 he also became the first director of the Marine Physical Laboratory (MPL) of the University of California. The MPL was founded by Eckart, Roger Revelle, and Admiral Rawson Bennett to conduct geophysical research of common interest to the academic and naval communities. In 1948, the MPL became an integral part of the Scripps Institution of Oceanography, and Eckart served as the fourth director of Scripps until 1950. Eckart contributed to geophysics by linking theoretical hydrodynamic exercises to actual physical properties of water. In the following decades he did research on thermal layering in the ocean and atmospheres on which he wrote a book, the transmission of sound in the sea, turbulence, air-sea interactions, the generation and structure of surface, and internal ocean waves.

After World War II, Eckart collected his work and the work of others on underwater detection and published it a classified volume entitled Principles and Applications of Underwater Sound, which was first published in 1946. It was declassified in 1954 and reprinted in 1968. It is a standard reference.

During the period 1957 to 1959, Eckart was a member of the Editorial Advisory Board for the Johns Hopkins University Applied Physics Laboratory's series on applied mathematics and mechanics. From 1959 through 1970, he was also a consultant for commercial enterprises such as General Dynamics Corporation and the Rand Corporation.

From 1965 to 1967, Eckart was vice-chancellor for academic affairs at UCSD. He then served the University of California, from 1967 to 1968, as alternate representative to the Institute for Defense Analyses, which was made up of 12 member universities and functioned as an independent source for studies and advice for the Department of Defense.

Eckart contributed to the posthumous publication of some works by the mathematician John von Neumann.

== Personal life ==
Eckart married Edith Louise née Frazee in 1926; they were divorced in 1948. In 1958, he married Klára Dán von Neumann, the widow of the mathematician John von Neumann; Klara died in 1963 in a drowning accident, officially ruled a suicide. Eckart himself died in La Jolla, California.

== Honors ==
- 1948 – Certificate of Merit signed by President Harry Truman
- 1952 – Elected to the National Academy of Sciences
- 1966 – Awarded the Alexander Agassiz Medal by the National Academy of Sciences for contributions to oceanography.
- 1972 – Awarded the William Bowie Medal by the American Geophysical Union for outstanding contributions to fundamental geophysics.

== Books ==
- Werner Heisenberg, Translated by Carl Eckart and F. C. Hoyt The Physical Principles of the Quantum Theory (Dover, 1930)
- Carl Eckart and others. Principles and Applications of Underwater Sound (NRDC, 1946). Originally a classified document and published as a Summary Technical Report of Division 6, NDRC Volume 7, Washington, D.C., 1946. Declassified and distributed September 7, 1954. Reprinted and redistributed by Department of the Navy Headquarters Naval Material Command, Washington, D.C., 1968.
- Carl Eckart Hydrodynamics of Oceans and Atmospheres (Pergamon Press, 1960)

== Selected literature ==
- Eckart, Carl (1926). "The Solution of the Problem of the Simple Oscillator by a Combination of the Schroedinger and the Lanczos Theories". Proceedings of the National Academy of Sciences. 12 (7): 473–476. doi:10.1073/pnas.12.7.473. ISSN 0027-8424. PMC 1084628. PMID 16587109.
- Eckart, Carl (1926-10-01). "Operator Calculus and the Solution of the Equations of Quantum Dynamics". Physical Review. 28 (4): 711–726. doi:10.1103/PhysRev.28.711. ISSN 0031-899X.
- Eckart, Carl (1928). "Über die Elektronentheorie der Metalle auf Grund der Fermischen Statistik, insbesondere über den Volta-Effekt". Zeitschrift für Physik (in German). 47 (1–2): 38–42. doi:10.1007/BF01391054. ISSN 1434-6001.
- Eckart, Carl (1930-07-01). "The Application of Group theory to the Quantum Dynamics of Monatomic Systems". Reviews of Modern Physics. 2 (3): 305–380. doi:10.1103/RevModPhys.2.305. ISSN 0034-6861.
- Eckart, Carl (1935-04-01). "Some Studies Concerning Rotating Axes and Polyatomic Molecules". Physical Review. 47 (7): 552–558. doi:10.1103/PhysRev.47.552. ISSN 0031-899X.
- Eckart, Carl (1948-04-01). "The Approximate Solution of One-Dimensional Wave Equations". Reviews of Modern Physics. 20 (2): 399–417. doi:10.1103/RevModPhys.20.399. ISSN 0034-6861.
- Eckart, Carl (1940). "The thermodynamics of irreversible processes. I. The simple fluid". Physical Review. 58 (3): 267–269. doi:10.1103/PhysRev.58.267.
- Eckart, Carl (1940). "The thermodynamics of irreversible processes. II. Fluid mixtures". Physical Review. 58 (3): 269–275. doi:10.1103/PhysRev.58.269.
- Eckart, Carl (1940). "The thermodynamics of irreversible processes. III. Relativistic theory of the simple fluid". Physical Review. 58 (10): 919–924. doi:10.1103/PhysRev.58.919.

== See also ==
- Eckart Hamiltonian

== Notes ==
Preceded by T. Wayland Vaughan	Director of Scripps Institution of Oceanography; 1936–1952	Succeeded by Roger Revelle
