= Dilithium (disambiguation) =

Dilithium is a molecule with formula Li_{2}.

Dilithium may also refer to:

- Dilithium (Star Trek), a fictional substance in the Star Trek franchise
- CRYSTALS-Dilithium, an algorithm used in post-quantum cryptography
