= Richard Barry Bernstein =

American physical chemist (1923–1990)

Richard Bernstein
- Born: October 31, 1923; Long Island, New York
- Died: July 8, 1990 (aged 66); Helsinki, Finland
- Education: Columbia University
- Known for: Femtochemistry; LeRoy-Bernstein Theory; LeRoy-Bernstein Distance
- Awards: National Medal of Science, National Academy of Sciences Award, Willard Gibbs Award, Peter Debye Award, Irving Langmuir Award, Welch Award
- Scientific career
- Fields: Chemical Physicist; Chemical Kineticist; Femtochemistry(founder)
- Workplaces: University of Michigan; University of Wisconsin; University of Texas; UCLA
- Doctoral advisor: T.I. Taylor
- Doctoral students: Robert J. LeRoy

Richard Barry Bernstein (October 31, 1923 – July 8, 1990) was an American physical chemist. He is primarily known for his research in chemical kinetics and reaction dynamics by molecular beam scattering and laser techniques. He is credited with having founded femtochemistry, which laid the groundwork for developments in femtobiology. He was elected a Fellow of the American Academy of Arts and Sciences in 1970. Among his awards were the National Medal of Science and the Willard Gibbs Award, both in 1989.

Bernstein received his doctorate in chemistry from Columbia University in 1948.

Bernstein had a heart attack in Moscow and died shortly afterwards in Helsinki, Finland, aged 66.
