= LeRoy radius =

The LeRoy radius, derived by Robert J. LeRoy, defines the internuclear distance between two atoms at which LeRoy-Bernstein theory (sometimes called near-dissociation theory) becomes valid.

LeRoy-Bernstein theory is a semi-classical (WKB) approach for describing vibrational energy levels near the molecular dissociation limit. In this limit, the interaction potential between two atoms can be approximated as $V(r) = \mathfrak{D} - C_{n}/r^{n}$, which gives rise to a simple analytical approximation for the vibrational energy levels:

$$G(v) = \mathfrak{D}-X_n(C_n)[v_{\mathfrak{D}} - v]^{\frac{2n}{n-2}}.$$

In this expression, $X_n(C_n)$ is a simple function depending only upon n and C_{n}, and $v_{\mathfrak D}$ can be identified as an effective vibrational quantum number at dissociation.

LeRoy later defined an expression for the radius that approximates a boundary between the region where electron exchange (quantum-mechanical) terms are prominent, and the region where atoms and molecules approximately interact through the laws of classical physics and, thus, LeRoy-Bernstein theory (as independent charge distributions and van der Waals interactions expressible as a power series in the internuclear separation).

This radius is defined as

$$R_{\mathrm{LR}} = 2[\langle r_A^2 \rangle ^{1/2} + \langle r_B^2 \rangle ^{1/2}]$$,

where r_{A} and r_{B} denote the atomic radii of the two atoms.

For $r>R_{LR}$, the internuclear potential can be reasonably approximated by charge independent atomic distributions, and the vibrational levels can be well described by LeRoy-Bernstein theory.

For $r<R_{LR}$, there is no generally applicable expression for the internuclear potential. Likewise, there is no analogous expression for the vibrational level energies for this region and more sophisticated approximations must be employed.

A derivation of a more general expression, called the m-dependent LeRoy radius, which depends on the magnetic quantum number (m), was derived in 1995. This expression yields the traditional LeRoy Radius in the special case of a spherical, S-state, atom.
