= Philip M. Morse =

American physicist (1903–85)

Philip McCord Morse
- Born: August 6, 1903; Shreveport, Louisiana, U.S.
- Died: September 5, 1985 (aged 82); Concord, Massachusetts, U.S.
- Education: Case School of Engineering (BS); Princeton University (PhD)
- Known for: Morse potential Rosen–Morse potential
- Awards: ASA Gold Medal (1973); Frederick W. Lanchester Prize (1968); Josiah Willard Gibbs Lectureship (1947); Medal for Merit (1946)
- Scientific career
- Workplaces: Ludwig-Maximilians-Universität München; Cambridge University; MIT
- Thesis: A Theory of the Electric Discharge through Gases (1929)
- Doctoral advisor: Karl Taylor Compton
- Doctoral students: Charles Draper; Ronald A. Howard; John Little; Leonard Schiff

Philip McCord Morse (August 6, 1903 – 5 September 1985), was an American physicist, administrator and pioneer of operations research (OR) in World War II. He is considered to be the father of operations research in the U.S.

== Biography ==
Morse graduated from the Case School of Applied Science in 1926 with a B.S. in physics. He earned his Ph.D. in physics from Princeton University in 1929. The same year (April 1929), he married Annabelle Hopkins. The couple had two children named Conrad Philip and Annabella. In 1930, he was granted an International Fellowship, which he used to do postgraduate study and research at the Ludwig-Maximilians-Universität München under Arnold Sommerfeld during the winter of 1930 to the spring of 1931.

From the spring through the summer of 1931, he was at Cambridge University. During this time, he collaborated with Ernst Stueckelberg on collision processes, and with William Allis wrote a seminal paper on the scattering of slow elections. Upon return to the United States, he joined the faculty of MIT. There, he became the director of the Operations Research Center and began to shine in the field of operations research. Some notable achievements include lecturing about the topic across various nations and collaborating on projects of the non-military Organization for Economic Cooperation and Development (OECD).

In 1949, he was named the first research director of the Weapons Systems Evaluation Group (WSEG), an organization founded to conduct studies for the Joint Chiefs of Staff, where he served a year and a half before returning to MIT in the summer of 1950. In 1956, he launched MIT’s operations research center, directing it until his retirement from MIT in 1968, and awarding the first Ph.D. in operations research in the U.S. to John Little.

He was a member of a National Research Council committee dedicated to bringing OR into civilian life, and was a prime mover behind the creation of the Operations Research Society of America (ORSA) in 1952. He served as president of the American Physical Society, president of the Acoustical Society of America (ASA), and board chair of the American Institute of Physics.

In 1946, he was a recipient of the Medal for Merit from the U.S. President for his work during the war. In 1973 the ASA awarded him the Gold Medal, its highest award, for his work on vibration.

== Work ==
=== Operations research ===
Philip Morse made many contributions to the development of operations research (OR). Early in 1942 he organized the Anti-Submarine Warfare Operations Research Group (ASWORG), later ORG, for the U.S. Navy, after the US had entered World War II and was faced with the problem of Nazi German U-boat attacks on transatlantic shipping. "That Morse’s group was an important factor in winning the war is fairly obvious to everyone who knows anything about the inside of the war," wrote historian John Burchard. During World War II, Morse emphasized that effective operational decisions required scientifically trained observers to work directly in the field, collecting and analyzing real-world data and ensuring that new technologies and tactics were adapted to actual operational conditions. Morse led the U.S. Navy Operations Research Group, where he helped formalize operations research by introducing a systematic approach to decision-making based on identifying key variables and deriving quantitative relationships, extending beyond simple data collection to structured mathematical modeling.

After the war, he lectured on the topic around the world, securing grants to travel to Japan, India, Israel, Taiwan, and Australia, among several other countries.

Philip Morse co-authored Methods of Operations Research, the first OR textbook in the U.S., with George E. Kimball based on the Navy work. His further writings include the influential books Queues, Inventories, and Maintenance and Library Effectiveness, which applies OR in civilian situations such as library management. He received ORSA's Lanchester Prize in 1968 for the latter book.

Philip Morse gave the opening address at the 1957 organizing meeting of the International Federation of Operational Research Societies (IFORS). In 1959 he chaired the first NATO advisory panel on OR.

=== Physics ===
Philip Morse had a distinguished career in physics. Amongst his contributions to physics are the textbooks Quantum Mechanics (with Edward Condon), Methods of Theoretical Physics (with Herman Feshbach), Vibration and Sound, Theoretical Acoustics, and Thermal Physics. Morse is also one of the founding editors of Annals of Physics. In 1929, he proposed the Morse potential function for diatomic molecules which was often used to interpret vibrational spectra, though the standard is now the more modern Morse/Long-range potential. He co-authored the first American textbook on quantum mechanics with E.U. Condon in 1929, the same year he earned his PhD from Princeton University. He also revolutionized the study of acoustics with his book Vibration and Sound in 1936, a product of a new course on acoustics he developed as part of a "renaissance" of the MIT Physics Department. His seminal research paper on this topic, "Sound Waves in Rooms," co-authored with Richard H. Bolt, was published in the Review of Modern Physics in 1944. The paper forms the foundation of modern room acoustics used in designing orchestral halls today.

=== Administration ===
His administrative talents were applied in roles as co-founder of the MIT Acoustics Laboratory and first director of the Brookhaven National Laboratory. As the founder and first director of the MIT Computation Center (1956), he pioneered the model of centralized academic computing, advocating for a system where large-scale computing power was a shared, interdisciplinary resource available to all departments rather than restricted to a single field. Through his role as chair of MIT's Computation Committee, he was instrumental in persuading IBM to donate the IBM 704—its most powerful computer at the time—to MIT, along with funding for a dozen student fellowships in computer use. While directing the MIT Computation Center, Morse encouraged graduate student Fernando Corbató to work on Project Whirlwind. Whirlwind was one of the earliest real-time computers, and Corbató's experience with it led him to develop CTSS, one of the first time-sharing operating systems, and later to lead the Multics project, which directly inspired Unix and modern operating systems. Corbató received the Turing Award in 1990 for this work. He also served as a board member of the RAND Corporation and the Institute for Defense Analyses.

He chaired the advisory committee that supervised preparation of Handbook of Mathematical Functions, with Formulas, Graphs, and Mathematical Tables, commonly known as Abramowitz and Stegun.

== Publications ==
- 1945. Methods of Operations Research
- Queues, Inventories, and Maintenance and Library Effectiveness
- Quantum Mechanics. With Edward Condon.
- Methods of Theoretical Physics with Herman Feshbach.
- Vibration and Sound.
- Theoretical Acoustics with K. Uno Ingard.
- Thermal Physics
- 1977. In at the Beginnings: A Physicist's Life. Cambridge, Massachusetts: MIT Press, 1977.
