= Fermi resonance =

Shift of energy in physics

A Fermi resonance is the shifting of the energies and intensities of absorption bands in an infrared or Raman spectrum. It is a consequence of quantum-mechanical wavefunction mixing. The phenomenon was first explained by the Italian physicist Enrico Fermi.

== Selection rules and occurrence ==
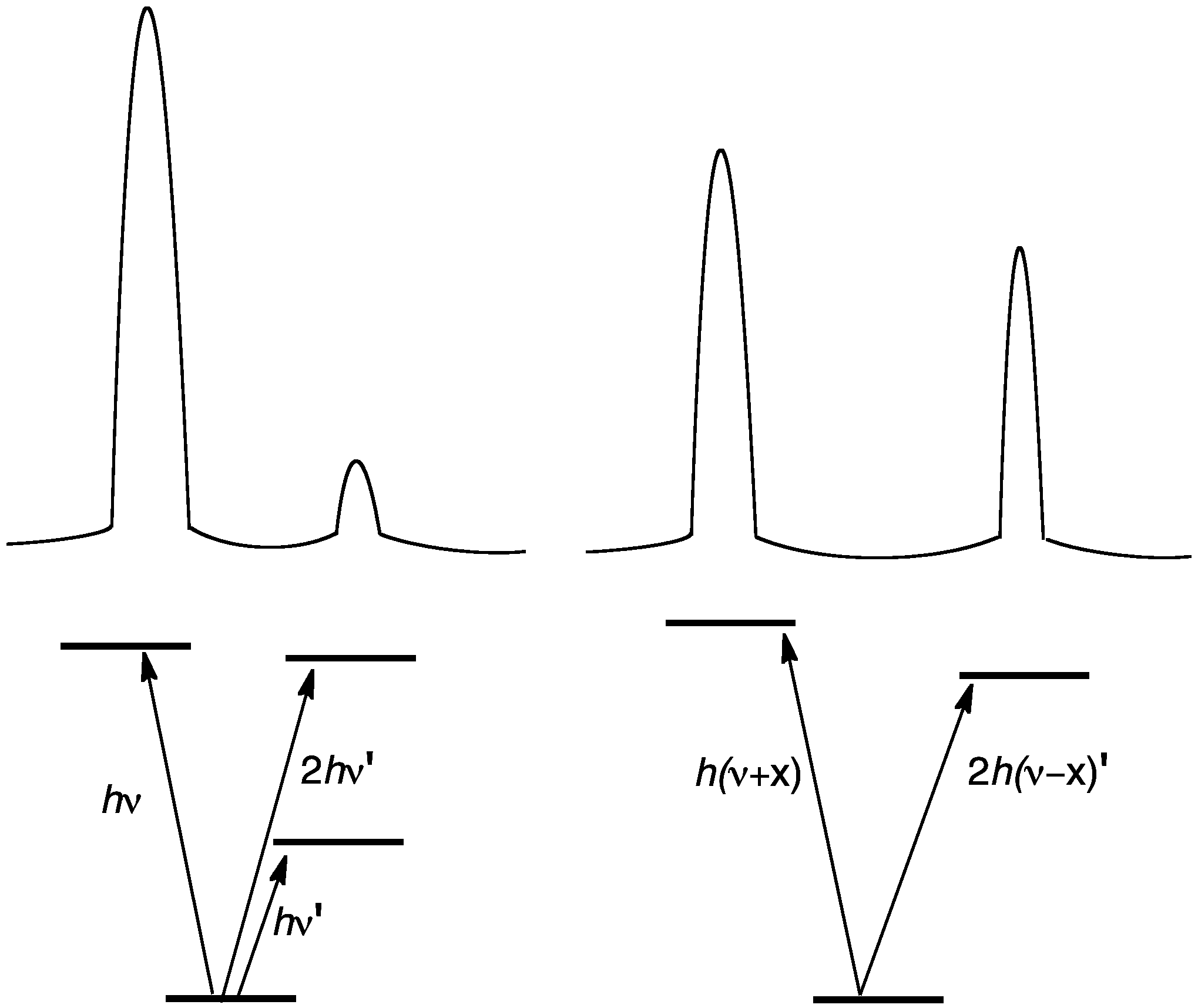
Idealized appearance of a normal mode and an overtone before and after Fermi resonance. Beneath the idealized spectra are idealized energy-level schemes.

Two conditions must be satisfied for the occurrence of Fermi resonance:

- The two vibrational modes of a molecule transform according to the same irreducible representation in their molecular point group. In other words, the two vibrations must have the same symmetries (Mulliken symbols).
- The transitions coincidentally have very similar energies.

Fermi resonance most often occurs between fundamental and overtone excitations, if they are nearly coincident in energy.

Fermi resonance leads to two effects. First, the high-energy mode shifts to higher energy, and the low-energy mode shifts to still lower energy. Second, the weaker mode gains intensity (becomes more allowed), and the more intense band decreases in intensity. The two transitions are describable as a linear combination of the parent modes. Fermi resonance does not lead to additional bands in the spectrum, but rather shifts in bands that would otherwise exist.

== Examples ==
=== Ketones ===
High-resolution IR spectra of most ketones reveal that the "carbonyl band" is split into a doublet. The peak separation is usually only a few cm^{−1}. This splitting arises from the mixing of ν_{CO} and the overtone of HCH bending modes.

=== CO_{2} ===
In CO_{2}, the bending vibration ν_{2} (667 cm^{−1}) has symmetry Π_{u}. The first excited state of ν_{2} is denoted 01^{1}0 (no excitation in the ν_{1} mode (symmetric stretch), one quantum of excitation in the ν_{2} bending mode with angular momentum about the molecular axis equal to ±1, no excitation in the ν_{3} mode (asymmetric stretch)) and clearly transforms according to the irreducible representation Π_{u}. Putting two quanta into the ν_{2} mode leads to a state with components of symmetry (Π_{u} × Π_{u})_{+} = Σ^{+}_{g} + Δ _{g}. These are called 02^{0}0 and 02^{2}0 respectively. 02^{0}0 has the same symmetry (Σ^{+}_{g}) and a very similar energy to the first excited state of v_{1} denoted 100 (one quantum of excitation in the ν_{1} symmetric stretch mode, no excitation in the ν_{2} mode, no excitation in the ν_{3} mode). The calculated unperturbed frequency of 100 is 1337 cm^{−1}, and, ignoring anharmonicity, the frequency of 02^{0}0 is 1334 cm^{−1}, twice the 667 cm^{−1} of 01^{1}0. The states 02^{0}0 and 100 can therefore mix, producing a splitting and also a significant increase in the intensity of the 02^{0}0 transition, so that both the 02^{0}0 and 100 transitions have similar intensities.
