= Morse/Long-range potential =

Model of the potential energy of a diatomic molecule

The Morse/Long-range potential (MLR potential) is an interatomic interaction model for the potential energy of a diatomic molecule. Due to the simplicity of the regular Morse potential (it only has three adjustable parameters), it is very limited in its applicability in modern spectroscopy. The MLR potential is a modern version of the Morse potential which has the correct theoretical long-range form of the potential naturally built into it. It has been an important tool for spectroscopists to represent experimental data, verify measurements, and make predictions. It is useful for its extrapolation capability when data for certain regions of the potential are missing, its ability to predict energies with accuracy often better than the most sophisticated ab initio techniques, and its ability to determine precise empirical values for physical parameters such as the dissociation energy, equilibrium bond length, and long-range constants. Cases of particular note include:

1. the c-state of dilithium (Li_{2}): where the MLR potential was successfully able to bridge a gap of more than 5000 cm^{−1} in experimental data. Two years later it was found that the MLR potential was able to successfully predict the energies in the middle of this gap, correctly within about 1 cm^{−1}. The accuracy of these predictions was much better than the most sophisticated ab initio techniques at the time.
2. the A-state of Li_{2}: where Le Roy et al. constructed an MLR potential which determined the C_{3} value for atomic lithium to a higher-precision than any previously measured atomic oscillator strength, by an order of magnitude. This lithium oscillator strength is related to the radiative lifetime of atomic lithium and is used as a benchmark for atomic clocks and measurements of fundamental constants.
3. the a-state of KLi: where the MLR was used to build an analytic global potential successfully despite there only being a small amount of levels observed near the top of the potential.

== Historical origins ==
The MLR potential is based on the classic Morse potential which was first introduced in 1929 by Philip M. Morse. A primitive version of the MLR potential was first introduced in 2006 by Robert J. Le Roy and colleagues for a study on N_{2}. This primitive form was used on Ca_{2}, KLi and MgH, before the more modern version was introduced in 2009. A further extension of the MLR potential referred to as the MLR3 potential was introduced in a 2010 study of Cs_{2}, and this potential has since been used on HF, HCl, HBr and HI.

== Function ==
The Morse/Long-range potential energy function is of the form
$$V(r) = \mathfrak{D}_e \left( 1- \frac{u(r)}{u(r_e)} e^{-\beta(r) y_p^{r_{\rm{eq}}}(r)} \right)^2$$
where for large $r$,
$$V(r) \simeq \mathfrak{D}_e - u(r) + \frac{u(r)^2}{4\mathfrak{D}_e},$$
so $u(r)$ is defined according to the theoretically correct long-range behavior expected for the interatomic interaction. $\mathfrak{D}_e$ is the depth of the potential at equilibrium.

This long-range form of the MLR model is guaranteed because the argument of the exponent is defined to have long-range behavior:
$$\beta(r) y_p^{r_{\rm{ref}}}(r) \simeq \beta_\infty = \ln\left(\frac{2\mathfrak{D}_e}{u(r_e)}\right),$$
where $r_e$ is the equilibrium bond length.

There are a few ways in which this long-range behavior can be achieved, the most common is to make $\beta(r)$ a polynomial that is constrained to become $\beta_\infty$ at long-range:
$$\beta(r) = \left(1-y_p^{r_{\textrm{ref}}}(r)\right)\sum_{i=0}^{N_{\beta}} \beta_i y_q^{r_{\textrm{ref}}}(r)^i + y_p^{r_{\textrm{ref}}}(r)\beta_\infty,$$
$$y_n^{r_x}(r) = \frac{r^n-r_x^n}{r^n+r_x^n},$$
where n is an integer greater than 1, which value is defined by the model chosen for the long-range potential $u_\text{LR}(r)$.

It is clear to see that:
$$\lim_{r\to \infty}\beta(r) = \beta_\infty.$$

== Applications ==
The MLR potential has successfully summarized all experimental spectroscopic data (and/or virial data) for a number of diatomic molecules, including: N_{2}, Ca_{2}, KLi, MgH, several electronic states of Li_{2}, Cs_{2}, Sr_{2}, ArXe, LiCa, LiNa, Br_{2}, Mg_{2}, HF, HCl, HBr, HI, MgD, Be_{2}, BeH, and NaH. More sophisticated versions are used for polyatomic molecules.

It has also become customary to fit ab initio points to the MLR potential, to achieve a fully analytic ab initio potential and to take advantage of the MLR's ability to incorporate the correct theoretically known short- and long-range behavior into the potential (the latter usually being of higher accuracy than the molecular ab initio points themselves because it is based on atomic ab initio calculations rather than molecular ones, and because features like spin-orbit coupling which are difficult to incorporate into molecular ab initio calculations can more easily be treated in the long-range). MLR has been used to represent ab initio points for KLi and KBe.

== See also ==
- Dilithium
- Morse potential
- Lennard-Jones potential
