= GF method =

Wilson's normal mode analysis

The GF method, sometimes referred to as FG method, is a classical mechanical method introduced by Edgar Bright Wilson to obtain certain internal coordinates for a vibrating semi-rigid molecule, the so-called normal coordinates Q_{k}. Normal coordinates decouple the classical vibrational motions of the molecule and thus give an easy route to obtaining vibrational amplitudes of the atoms as a function of time. In Wilson's GF method it is assumed that the molecular kinetic energy consists only of harmonic vibrations of the atoms, i.e., overall rotational and translational energy is ignored. Normal coordinates appear also in a quantum mechanical description of the vibrational motions of the molecule and the Coriolis coupling between rotations and vibrations.

It follows from application of the Eckart conditions that the matrix G^{−1} gives the kinetic energy in terms of arbitrary linear internal coordinates, while F represents the (harmonic) potential energy in terms of these coordinates. The GF method gives the linear transformation from general internal coordinates to the special set of normal coordinates.

== The GF method ==
A non-linear molecule consisting of N atoms has 3N − 6 internal degrees of freedom, because positioning a molecule in three-dimensional space requires three degrees of freedom, and the description of its orientation in space requires another three degree of freedom. These degrees of freedom must be subtracted from the 3N degrees of freedom of a system of N particles.

The interaction among atoms in a molecule is described by a potential energy surface (PES), which is a function of 3N − 6 coordinates. The internal degrees of freedom s_{1}, ..., s_{3N−6} describing the PES in an optimal way are often non-linear; they are for instance valence coordinates, such as bending and torsion angles and bond stretches. It is possible to write the quantum mechanical kinetic energy operator for such curvilinear coordinates, but it is hard to formulate a general theory applicable to any molecule. This is why Wilson linearized the internal coordinates by assuming small displacements. The linearized version of the internal coordinate s_{t} is denoted by S_{t}.

The PES V can be Taylor expanded around its minimum in terms of the S_{t}. The third term (the Hessian of V) evaluated in the minimum is a force derivative matrix F. In the harmonic approximation the Taylor series is ended after this term. The second term, containing first derivatives, is zero because it is evaluated in the minimum of V. The first term can be included in the zero of energy. Thus,

$$2V \approx \sum_{s,t=1}^{3N-6} F_{st} S_s\, S_t.$$

The classical vibrational kinetic energy has the form:

$$2T = \sum_{s,t=1}^{3N-6} g_{st}(\mathbf{s})  \dot{S}_s\dot{S}_t ,$$

where g_{st} is an element of the metric tensor of the internal (curvilinear) coordinates. The dots indicate time derivatives. Mixed terms $S_s\, \dot{S}_t$ generally present in curvilinear coordinates are not present here, because only linear coordinate transformations are used. Evaluation of the metric tensor g in the minimum s^{0} of V gives the positive definite and symmetric matrix G = g(s^{0})^{−1}. One can solve the two matrix problems

$$\mathbf{L}^\mathrm{T} \mathbf{F} \mathbf{L} =\boldsymbol{\Phi}
\quad \mathrm{and}\quad \mathbf{L}^\mathrm{T} \mathbf{G}^{-1} \mathbf{L} = \mathbf{E},$$

simultaneously, since they are equivalent to the generalized eigenvalue problem

$$\mathbf{G} \mathbf{F} \mathbf{L} = \mathbf{L} \boldsymbol{\Phi},$$

where $\boldsymbol{\Phi}=\operatorname{diag}(f_1,\ldots, f_{3N-6})$ where f_{i} is equal to $4{\pi}^{2}{\nu}_i^{2}$ (${\nu}_i$ is the frequency of normal mode i); $\mathbf{E}\,$ is the unit matrix. The matrix L^{−1} contains the normal coordinates Q_{k} in its rows:

$$Q_k = \sum_{t=1}^{3N-6} (\mathbf{L}^{-1})_{kt} S_t , \quad k=1,\ldots, 3N-6. \,$$

Because of the form of the generalized eigenvalue problem, the method is called the GF method, often with the name of its originator attached to it: Wilson's GF method. By matrix transposition in both sides of the equation and using the fact that both G and F are symmetric matrices, as are diagonal matrices, one can recast this equation into a very similar one for FG . This is why the method is also referred to as Wilson's FG method.

We introduce the vectors

$$\mathbf{s} = \operatorname{col}(S_1,\ldots, S_{3N-6})
\quad\mathrm{and}\quad
\mathbf{Q} = \operatorname{col}(Q_1,\ldots, Q_{3N-6}),$$

which satisfy the relation

$$\mathbf{s} = \mathbf{L} \mathbf{Q}.$$

Upon use of the results of the generalized eigenvalue equation, the energy E = T + V (in the harmonic approximation) of the molecule becomes:

$$2E = \dot{\mathbf{s}}^\mathrm{T} \mathbf{G}^{-1}\dot{\mathbf{s}}+
\mathbf{s}^\mathrm{T}\mathbf{F}\mathbf{s}$$

$$= \dot{\mathbf{Q}}^\mathrm{T}  \; \left( \mathbf{L}^\mathrm{T} \mathbf{G}^{-1} \mathbf{L}\right) \;  \dot{\mathbf{Q}}+
\mathbf{Q}^\mathrm{T} \left(  \mathbf{L}^\mathrm{T}\mathbf{F}\mathbf{L}\right)\;  \mathbf{Q}$$

$$= \dot{\mathbf{Q}}^\mathrm{T}\dot{\mathbf{Q}} + \mathbf{Q}^\mathrm{T}\boldsymbol{\Phi}\mathbf{Q}
= \sum_{t=1}^{3N-6} \big( \dot{Q}_t^2 +  f_t Q_t^2 \big).$$

The Lagrangian L = T − V is

$$L = \frac{1}{2} \sum_{t=1}^{3N-6} \big( \dot{Q}_t^2 - f_t Q_t^2 \big).$$

The corresponding Lagrange equations are identical to the Newton equations

$$\ddot{Q}_t + f_t \,Q_t = 0$$

for a set of uncoupled harmonic oscillators. These ordinary second-order differential equations are easily solved, yielding Q_{t} as a function of time; see the article on harmonic oscillators.

== Normal coordinates in terms of Cartesian displacement coordinates ==
Often the normal coordinates are expressed as linear combinations of Cartesian displacement coordinates. Let R_{A} be the position vector of nucleus A and R_{A}^{0} the corresponding equilibrium position. Then $\mathbf{x}_A \equiv \mathbf{R}_A -\mathbf{R}_A^0$ is by definition the Cartesian displacement coordinate of nucleus A. Wilson's linearizing of the internal curvilinear coordinates q_{t} expresses the coordinate S_{t} in terms of the displacement coordinates

$$S_t =\sum_{A=1}^N \sum_{i=1}^3 s^t_{Ai} \, x_{Ai}= \sum_{A=1}^N \mathbf{s}^t_{A} \cdot \mathbf{x}_{A}, \quad \mathrm{for}\quad t = 1,\ldots,3N-6,$$

where s_{A}^{t} is known as a Wilson s-vector. If we put the $s^t_{Ai}$ into a (3N − 6) × 3N matrix B, this equation becomes in matrix language

$$\mathbf{s} = \mathbf{B} \mathbf{x}.$$

The actual form of the matrix elements of B can be fairly complicated. Especially for a torsion angle, which involves 4 atoms, it requires tedious vector algebra to derive the corresponding values of the $s^t_{Ai}$. See for more details on this method, known as the Wilson s-vector method, the book by Wilson et al., or molecular vibration. Now,

$$\mathbf{s} = \mathbf{L} \mathbf{Q} = \mathbf{L} \mathbf{l}^{tr} \mathbf{q} = \mathbf{B} \mathbf{M}^{-1/2} \mathbf{q} \equiv \mathbf{D} \mathbf{q},$$

which can be inverted and put in summation language:

$$Q_k = \sum_{A=1}^N \sum_{i=1}^3 D^k_{Ai}\, d_{Ai} \quad \mathrm{for}\quad k=1,\ldots, 3N-6.$$

Here D is a (3N − 6) × 3N matrix, which is given by (i) the linearization of the internal coordinates s (an algebraic process) and (ii) solution of Wilson's GF equations (a numeric process).

== Matrices involved in the analysis ==
There are several related coordinate systems commonly used in the GF matrix analysis. These quantities are related by a variety of matrices. For clarity, we provide the coordinate systems and their interrelations here.

The relevant coordinates are:

- $\mathbf{x}:$ Cartesian coordinates for each atom
- $\mathbf{s}:$ Internal coordinates for each atom
- $\mathbf{q}:$ Mass-weighted Cartesian coordinates
- $\mathbf{Q}:$ Normal coordinates

These different coordinate systems are related to one another by:

- $\mathbf{s} = \mathbf{B}\mathbf{x}$, i.e. the matrix $\mathbf{B}$ transforms the Cartesian coordinates to (linearized) internal coordinates.
- $\mathbf{x} = \mathbf{M}^{-1/2}\mathbf{q},$ i.e. the mass matrix $\mathbf{M}^{1/2}$ transforms Cartesian coordinates to mass-weighted Cartesian coordinates.
- $\mathbf{q} = \mathbf{l} \mathbf{Q},$ i.e. the matrix $\mathbf{l}$ transforms the normal coordinates to mass-weighted Cartesian coordinates.
- $\mathbf{s} = \mathbf{L}\mathbf{Q},$ i.e. the matrix $\mathbf{L}$ transforms the normal coordinates to internal coordinates.

Note the useful relationship:

$\mathbf{L}=\mathbf{B} \mathbf{M}^{-1/2} \mathbf{l}.$

These matrices allow one to construct the G matrix quite simply as

$\mathbf{G} = \mathbf{B} \mathbf{M}^{-1} \mathbf{B}^{\rm T}.$

== Relation to Eckart conditions ==
From the invariance of the internal coordinates S_{t} under overall rotation and translation of the molecule, follows the same for the linearized coordinates s^{t}_{A}. It can be shown that this implies that the following 6 conditions are satisfied by the internal coordinates,

$$\sum_{A=1}^N \mathbf{s}^t_{A}  = 0\quad\mathrm{and}\quad
\sum_{A=1}^N \mathbf{R}^0_A\times \mathbf{s}^t_A= 0,  \quad t=1,\ldots,3N-6.$$

These conditions follow from the Eckart conditions that hold for the displacement vectors,

$$\sum_{A=1}^N M_A\; \mathbf{d}_{A} = 0 \quad\mathrm{and}\quad
\sum_{A=1}^N M_A\;  \mathbf{R}^0_{A} \times \mathbf{d}_{A} = 0.$$

== Further references ==
- Califano, S. (1976). Vibrational States. New York-London: Wiley. ISBN 0-471-12996-8.
- Papoušek, D.; Aliev, M. R. (1982). Molecular Vibrational-Rotational Spectra. Elsevier. ISBN 0-444-99737-7.
- Wilson, E. B.; Decius, J. C.; Cross, P. C. (1995) [1955]. Molecular Vibrations. New York: Dover. ISBN 0-486-63941-X.
