= Hot band =

In molecular vibrational spectroscopy, a hot band is a band centred on a hot transition, which is a transition between two excited vibrational states, i.e. neither is the overall ground state. In infrared or Raman spectroscopy, hot bands refer to those transitions for a particular vibrational mode which arise from a state containing thermal population of another vibrational mode. For example, for a molecule with 3 normal modes, $\nu_1$, $\nu_2$ and $\nu_3$, the transition $101$ ← $001$, would be a hot band, since the initial state has one quantum of excitation in the $\nu_3$ mode. Hot bands are distinct from combination bands, which involve simultaneous excitation of multiple normal modes with a single photon, and overtones, which are transitions that involve changing the vibrational quantum number for a normal mode by more than 1.

== Vibrational hot bands ==
In the harmonic approximation, the normal modes of a molecule are not coupled, and all vibrational quantum levels are equally spaced, so hot bands would not be distinguishable from so-called "fundamental" transitions arising from the overall vibrational ground state. However, vibrations of real molecules always have some anharmonicity, which causes coupling between different vibrational modes that in turn shifts the observed frequencies of hot bands in vibrational spectra. Because anharmonicity decreases the spacing between adjacent vibrational levels, hot bands exhibit red shifts (appear at lower frequencies than the corresponding fundamental transitions). The magnitude of the observed shift is correlated to the degree of anharmonicity in the corresponding normal modes.

Both the lower and upper states involved in the transition are excited states. Therefore, the lower excited state must be populated for a hot band to be observed. The most common form of excitation is by thermal energy. The population of the lower excited state is then given by the Boltzmann distribution. In general the population can be expressed as

$${{N}\over{N_0}} = {{e^{-E/k_BT}}}$$

where k_{B} is the Boltzmann constant and E is the energy difference between the two states. In simplified form this can be expressed as

$${{N}\over{N_0}} = {{e^{- \nu /0.6952T}}}$$

where ν is the wavenumber [cm^{−1}] of the hot band and T is the temperature [K]. Thus, the intensity of a hot band, which is proportional to the population of the lower excited state, increases as the temperature increases.

== Combination bands ==
As mentioned above, combination bands involve changes in vibrational quantum numbers of more than one normal mode. These transitions are forbidden by harmonic oscillator selection rules, but are observed in vibrational spectra of real systems due to anharmonic couplings of normal modes. Combination bands typically have weak spectral intensities, but can become quite intense in cases where the anharmonicity of the vibrational potential is large. Broadly speaking, there are two types of combination bands.

=== Difference transition ===
A difference transition, or difference band, occurs between excited states of two different vibrations. Using the 3 mode example from above, $010$ ← $100$, is a difference transition. For difference bands involving transfer of a single quantum of excitation, as in the example, the frequency is approximately equal to the difference between the fundamental frequencies. The difference is not exact because there is anharmonicity in both vibrations. However the term "difference band" also applies to cases where more than one quantum is transferred, such as $100$ ← $020$.

Since the initial state of a difference band is always an excited state, difference bands are necessarily "hot bands"! Difference bands are seldom observed in conventional vibrational spectra, because they are forbidden transitions according to harmonic selection rules, and because populations of vibrationally excited states tend to be quite low.

=== Sum transition ===
A sum transition (sum band), occurs when two or more fundamental vibrations are excited simultaneously. For instance, $101$ ← $000$ and $012$ ← $001$, are examples of sum transitions. The frequency of a sum band is slightly less than the sum of the frequencies of the fundamentals, again due to anharmonic shifts in both vibrations.

Sum transitions are harmonic-forbidden, and thus typically have low intensities relative to vibrational fundamentals. Also, sum bands can be, but are not always, hot bands, and thus may also show reduced intensities from thermal population effects, as described above. Sum bands are more commonly observed than difference bands in vibrational spectra
