= Dilithium =

Diatomic molecule

- Wireframe model of dilithium

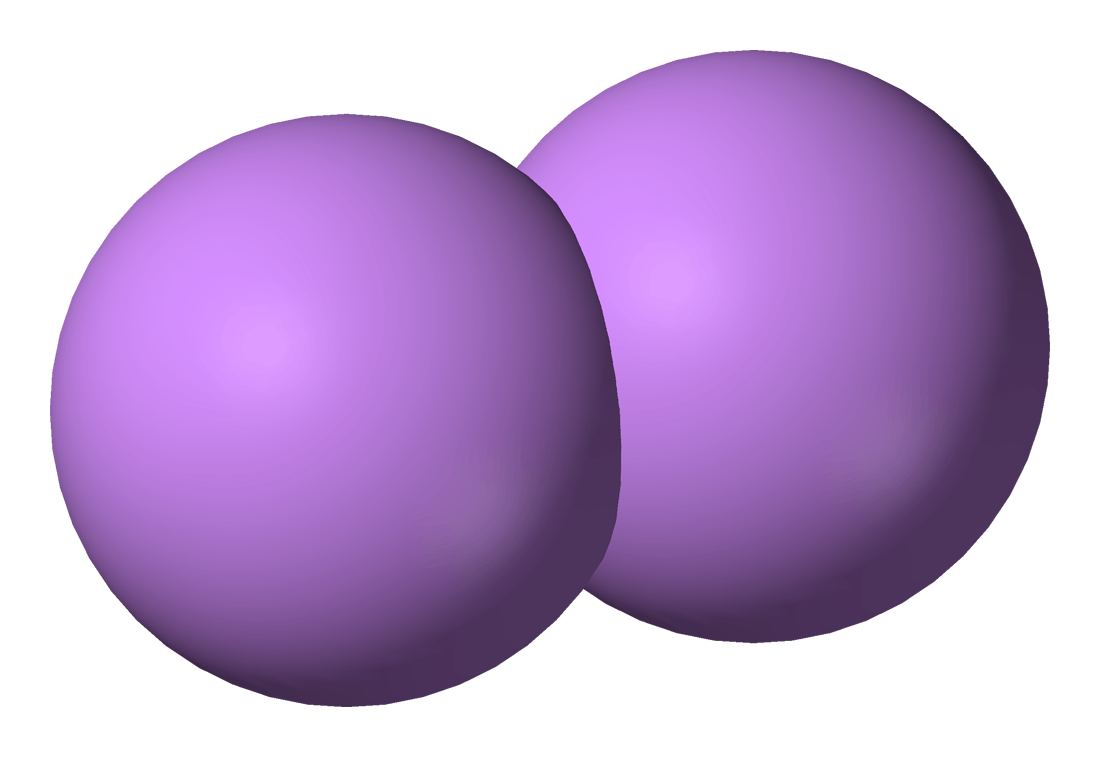
- Spacefill model of dilithium

Names
- IUPAC name Dilithium(Li—Li)

Identifiers
CAS Number	14452-59-6
3D model (JSmol)	Interactive image
ChemSpider	123254
PubChem CID	139759
CompTox Dashboard (EPA)	DTXSID90162747
- InChI: InChI=1S/2Li Key: SMBQBQBNOXIFSF-UHFFFAOYSA-N
- SMILES: [Li][Li]

Properties
Chemical formula	Li_{2}
Molar mass	13.88 g·mol^{−1}
- Except where otherwise noted, data are given for materials in their standard state (at 25 °C [77 °F], 100 kPa). verify (what is ?) Infobox references

Dilithium, Li_{2}, is a strongly nucleophilic, diatomic molecule comprising two lithium atoms covalently bonded together. Li_{2} has been observed in the gas phase. It has a bond order of 1, an internuclear separation of 267.3 pm and a bond energy of 102 kJ/mol or 1.06 eV in each bond. The electron configuration of Li_{2} may be written as σ^{2}.

Being the third-lightest stable neutral homonuclear diatomic molecule (after dihydrogen and dihelium), dilithium is an extremely important model system for studying fundamentals of physics, chemistry, and electronic structure theory.

It is the most thoroughly characterized compound in terms of the accuracy and completeness of the empirical potential energy curves of its electronic states. Analytic empirical potential energy curves have been constructed for the X-state, a-state, A-state, c-state, B-state, 2d-state, l-state, E-state, and the F-state. The most reliable of these potential energy curves are of the Morse/Long-range variety (see entries in the table below).

Li_{2} potentials are often used to extract atomic properties. For example, the C_{3} value for atomic lithium extracted from the A-state potential of Li_{2} by Le Roy et al. is more precise than any previously measured atomic oscillator strength. This lithium oscillator strength is related to the radiative lifetime of atomic lithium and is used as a benchmark for atomic clocks and measurements of fundamental constants.

Electronic state	Spectroscopic symbol	Term symbol	Bond length (pm)		Dissociation energy (cm^{−1})		Bound vibrational levels	References
1 (Ground)	X	1^{1}Σ_{g}^{+}	267	.298 74(19)	8 516	.780 0(23)	39	
2	a	1^{3}Σ_{u}^{+}	417	.000 6(32)	333	.779 5(62)	11	
3	b	1^{3}Π_{u}						
4	A	1^{1}Σ_{g}^{+}	310	.792 88(36)	9 353	.179 5 (28)	118	
5	c	1^{3}Σ_{g}^{+}	306	.543 6(16)	7 093	.492 6(86)	104	
6	B	1^{1}Π_{u}	293	.617 142(310)	2 984	.444	118	
7	E	3(?)^{1}Σ_{g}^{+}						

== See also ==
- Morse/Long-range potential
- Molecular orbital diagram § Dilithium
- Dilithium (Star Trek)
