= Robert J. LeRoy =

Canadian chemist (1943–2018)

Robert J. Le Roy
- Born: September 30, 1943; Ottawa, Ontario, Canada
- Died: August 10, 2018 (aged 74); Waterloo, Ontario, Canada
- Occupation: Chemist
- Known for: LeRoy radius
- Website: Department of Chemistry, LeRoy

Robert J. Le Roy (September 30, 1943 – August 10, 2018) was a Canadian chemist. He held the distinguished title of University Professor at the University of Waterloo.

== Career ==
His work on the Morse/Long-range potential with his former student Nike Dattani of Oxford University was referred to as a "landmark in diatomic spectral analysis". In the landmark work, the C_{3} value for atomic lithium was determined to a higher-precision than any atom's previously measured oscillator strength, by an order of magnitude. This lithium oscillator strength is related to the radiative lifetime of atomic lithium and is used as a benchmark for atomic clocks and measurements of fundamental constants.

== Awards and honors ==
- 1994 Rutherford Memorial Medal in Chemistry from the Royal Society of Canada
- 1995 J. Heyrovsky Honorary Medal for Merit in the Chemical Sciences from the Academy of Sciences of the Czech Republic.

== See also ==
- List of University of Waterloo people
