= George S. Monk =

American physicist

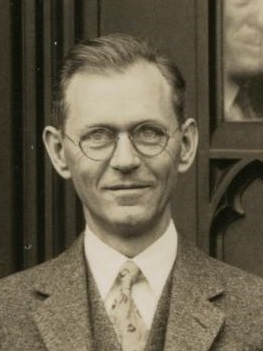
Monk, Chicago 1929

George Spencer Monk (September 12, 1884 – March 29, 1973) was an American physicist. He was an expert in optics for different types of electromagnetic radiation who worked on the Manhattan Project to develop the first nuclear weapon. He later worked for the United States Atomic Energy Commission (USAEC).

== Biography ==
Monk gained his BSc in 1914 at the University of Chicago and continued to work at the university. He married Ardis Thomas, a mathematician from the university, who later worked for the USAEC under Eugene Wigner during his project to construct a nuclear reactor. Monk became an associate professor of physics at the Ryerson Laboratory of the University of Chicago from 1929 to 1949. During his early career at the university, from 1924 to 1929 he co-wrote papers with the dean of the physics department, Henry Gale, on the atomic spectra of chlorine and hydrogen, and also with future Nobel Prize-winner Robert S. Mulliken on fine structure of bands in atomic spectra and the Zeeman effect. He was made a fellow of the American Physical Society in 1928. The same year, he wrote a paper with the title "A mounting for the plane grating". Twenty-one years later, A.H. Gillieson published a paper titled "A new spectrographic diffraction grating collimator". It was eventually made clear that the invention was not "new" and is now referred to as the "Monk-Gillieson monochromator" or "Monk-Gillieson mounting".

After the end of World War II, he worked for the Lawrence Berkeley National Laboratory as the chief of the optical department. He published Light : Principles and Experiments in 1937 and Optical Instrumentation in 1954, the latter with W.H. McCorkle

Monk died on March 29, 1973, in Boulder, Colorado.
