= Dimerization =

Chemical process of joining two molecular entities by bonds of any kind

In chemistry, dimerization is the process of joining two identical or similar molecular entities by bonds. The resulting bonds can be either strong or weak. Many symmetrical chemical species are described as dimers, even when the monomer is unknown or highly unstable.

The term homodimer is used when the two subunits are identical (e.g. A–A) and heterodimer when they are not (e.g. A–B). The reverse of dimerization is often called dissociation. When two oppositely-charged ions associate into dimers, they are referred to as Bjerrum pairs, after Danish chemist Niels Bjerrum.

== Noncovalent dimers ==
Dimers of carboxylic acids are often found in the vapour phase.

Anhydrous carboxylic acids form dimers by hydrogen bonding of the acidic hydrogen and the carbonyl oxygen. For example, acetic acid forms a dimer in the gas phase, where the monomer units are held together by hydrogen bonds. Many OH-containing molecules form dimers, e.g. the water dimer.

Dimers that form based on weak electrostatic interaction and/or van der Waals interactions have a short lifetime, but can be stabilized through special laboratory setups such as matrix-isolation. A prominent example is the carbon dioxide dimer, which is likely to be relevant to Venus atmosphere.

Excimers and exciplexes are excited structures with a short lifetime. For example, noble gases do not form stable dimers, but they do form the excimers Ar_{2}*, Kr_{2}* and Xe_{2}* under high pressure and electrical stimulation.

A notable example of a non-covalent, hydrogen-bonded homodimer is the cyclic hydroxylamine dimer (NH_{2}OH)_{2} . Although pure hydroxylamine crystallizes in a monomeric form, its isolated cyclic dimeric structure was first trapped and experimentally observed in 2026 within a macrocyclic crown-ether solvate framework.

== Covalent dimers ==
The dimerization of cyclopentadiene gives dicyclopentadiene, although this might not be readily apparent on initial inspection. This dimerization is reversible.

Molecular dimers are often formed by the reaction of two identical compounds e.g.: 2A → A−A. In this example, monomer "A" is said to dimerize to give the dimer "A−A".

Dicyclopentadiene is an asymmetrical dimer of two cyclopentadiene molecules that have reacted in a Diels-Alder reaction to give the product. Upon heating, it "cracks" (undergoes a retro-Diels-Alder reaction) to give identical monomers:

$$\ce{C10H12 ->  2  C5H6}$$

Many nonmetallic elements occur as dimers: hydrogen, nitrogen, oxygen, and the halogens fluorine, chlorine, bromine and iodine. Some metals form a proportion of dimers in their vapour phase: dilithium (Li_{2}), disodium (Na_{2}), dipotassium (K_{2}), dirubidium (Rb_{2}) and dicaesium (Cs_{2}). Such elemental dimers are homonuclear diatomic molecules.

== Polymer chemistry ==
In the context of polymers, "dimer" also refers to the degree of polymerization 2, regardless of the stoichiometry or condensation reactions.

One case where this is applicable is with disaccharides. For example, cellobiose is a dimer of glucose, even though the formation reaction produces water:

$$\ce{2 C6H12O6 -> C12H22O11 + H2O}$$

Here, the resulting dimer has a stoichiometry different from the initial pair of monomers.

Disaccharides need not be composed of the same monosaccharides to be considered dimers. An example is sucrose, a dimer of fructose and glucose, which follows the same reaction equation as presented above.

Amino acids can also form dimers, which are called dipeptides. An example is glycylglycine, consisting of two glycine molecules joined by a peptide bond. Other examples include aspartame and carnosine.

== Inorganic and organometallic dimers ==
Many molecules and ions are described as dimers, even when the monomer is elusive.

=== Boranes ===
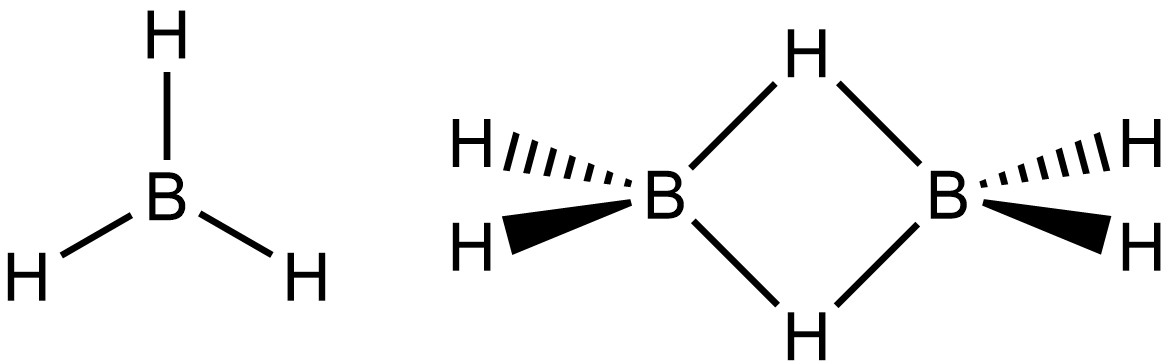
Borane and diborane

Diborane (B_{2}H_{6}) is an dimer of borane, which is elusive and rarely observed. Almost all compounds of the type R2BH exist as dimers.

=== Organoaluminium compounds ===
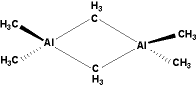
Trimethylaluminium dimer

Trialkylaluminium compounds can exist as either monomers or dimers, depending on the steric bulk of the groups attached. For example, trimethylaluminium exists as a dimer, but trimesitylaluminium adopts a monomeric structure.

=== Organochromium compounds ===
Cyclopentadienylchromium tricarbonyl dimer exists in measureable equilibrium quantities with the monometallic radical (C_{5}H_{5})Cr(CO)_{3}.

== Biochemical dimers ==
=== Pyrimidine dimers ===
Pyrimidine dimers (also known as thymine dimers) are formed by a photochemical reaction from pyrimidine DNA bases when exposed to ultraviolet light. This cross-linking causes DNA mutations, which can be carcinogenic, causing skin cancers. When pyrimidine dimers are present, they can block polymerases, decreasing DNA functionality until it is repaired.

=== Protein dimers ===
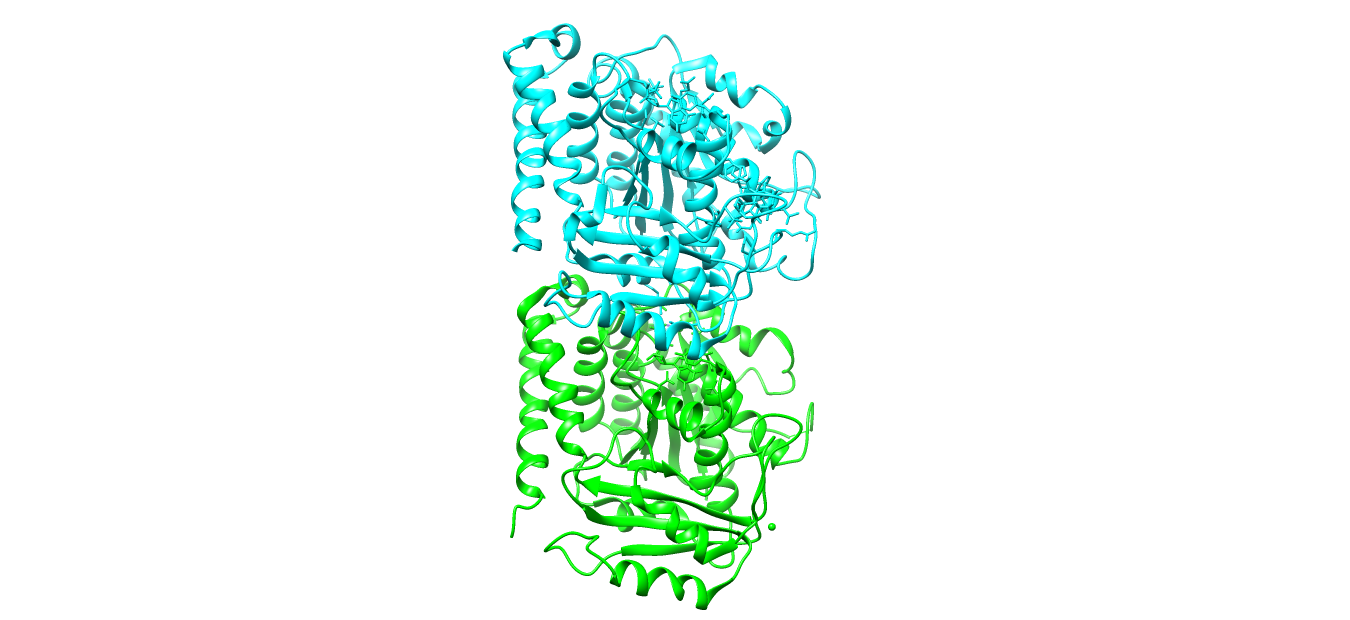
Tubulin dimer

Protein dimers arise from the interaction between two proteins which can interact further to form larger and more complex oligomers. For example, tubulin is formed by the dimerization of α-tubulin and β-tubulin and this dimer can then polymerize further to make microtubules. For symmetric proteins, the larger protein complex can be broken down into smaller identical protein subunits, which then dimerize to decrease the genetic code required to make the functional protein.

=== G protein-coupled receptors ===
As the largest and most diverse family of receptors within the human genome, G protein-coupled receptors (GPCR) have been studied extensively, with recent studies supporting their ability to form dimers. GPCR dimers include both homodimers and heterodimers formed from related members of the GPCR family. While not all, some GPCRs require dimerization to function, such as GABA_{B}-receptor, emphasizing the importance of dimers in biological systems.

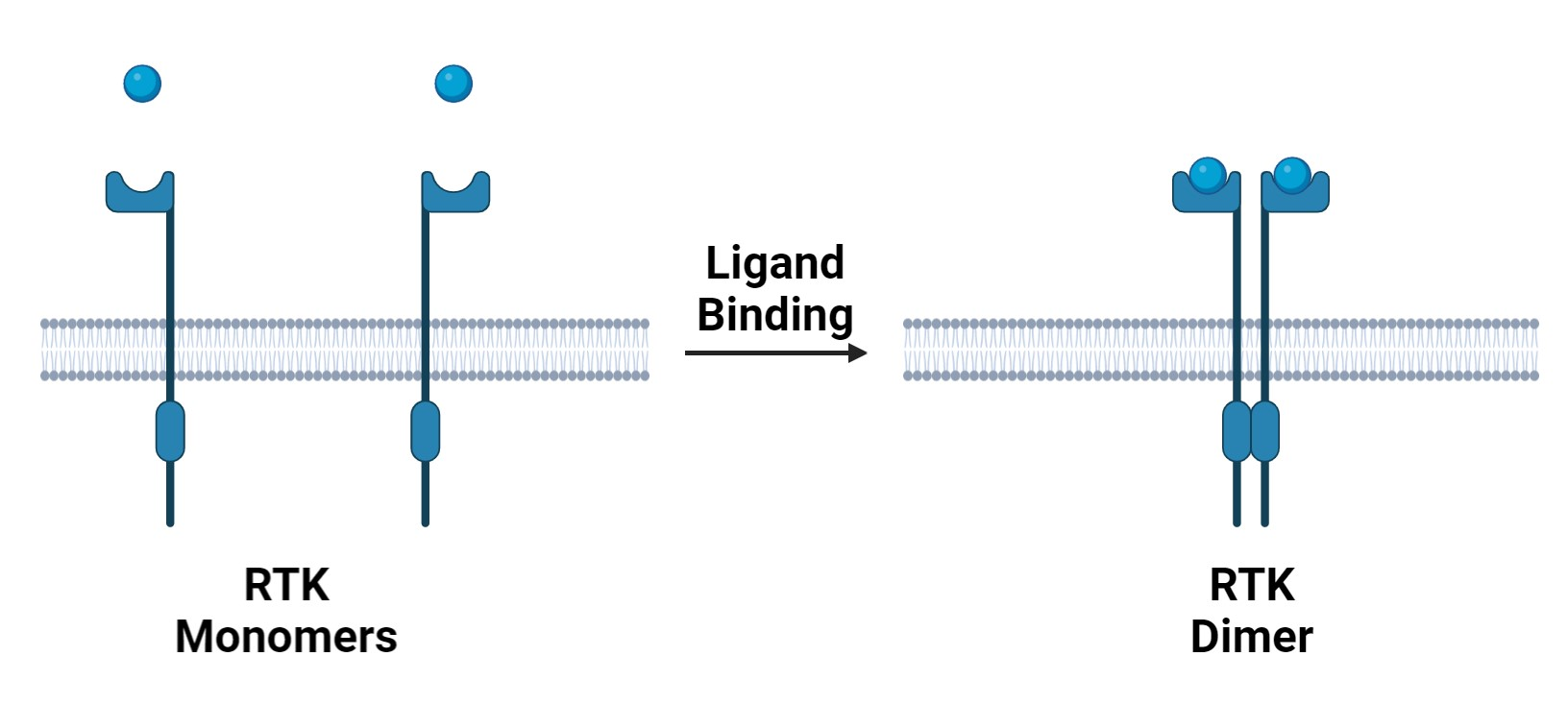
Receptor tyrosine kinase dimerization

=== Receptor tyrosine kinase ===
Much like for G protein-coupled receptors, dimerization is essential for receptor tyrosine kinases (RTK) to perform their function in signal transduction, affecting many different cellular processes. RTKs typically exist as monomers, but undergo a conformational change upon ligand binding, allowing them to dimerize with nearby RTKs. The dimerization activates the cytoplasmic kinase domains that are responsible for further signal transduction.

== See also ==
- Monomer
- Oligomer
- Polymer
- Protein dimer
- Trimer
