= Monatomic gas =

Gas made of free atoms

In physics and chemistry, "monatomic" is a combination of the words "mono" and "atomic", and means "single atom". It is usually applied to gases: a monatomic gas is a gas in which atoms are not bound to each other. Examples at standard conditions of temperature and pressure include all the noble gases (helium, neon, argon, krypton, xenon, and radon), though all chemical elements will be monatomic in the gas phase at sufficiently high temperature (or very low pressure). The thermodynamic behavior of a monatomic gas is much simpler when compared to polyatomic gases because it is free of any rotational or vibrational energy.

== Noble gases ==
The only chemical elements that are stable single atoms (so they are not molecules) at standard temperature and pressure (STP) are the noble gases. These are helium, neon, argon, krypton, xenon, and radon. Noble gases have a full outer valence shell making them rather non-reactive species. While these elements have been described historically as completely inert, chemical compounds have been synthesized with all but neon and helium.

When grouped together with the homonuclear diatomic gases such as nitrogen (N_{2}), the noble gases are called "elemental gases" to distinguish them from molecules that are also chemical compounds.

== Thermodynamic properties ==
The only possible motion of an atom in a monatomic gas is translation (electronic excitation is not important at room temperature). Thus by the equipartition theorem, the kinetic energy of a single atom of a monatomic gas at thermodynamic temperature T is given by $\frac{3}{2}k_\text{B}T$, where k_{B} is the Boltzmann constant. One mole of atoms contains an Avogadro number ($N_\text{A}$) of atoms, so that the energy of one mole of atoms of a monatomic gas is $\frac{3}{2} k_\text{B} T N_\text{A} = \frac{3}{2} RT$, where R is the gas constant.

In an adiabatic process, monatomic gases have an idealised γ-factor (C_{p}/C_{v}) of 5/3, as opposed to 7/5 for ideal diatomic gases where rotation (but not vibration at room temperature) also contributes. Also, for ideal monatomic gases:

the molar heat capacity at constant pressure (C_{p}) is 5/2 R = 20.8 J⋅K^{−1}⋅mol^{−1} (4.97 cal⋅K^{−1}⋅mol^{−1}).
the molar heat capacity at constant volume (C_{v}) is 3/2 R = 12.5 J⋅K^{−1}⋅mol^{−1} (2.98 cal⋅K^{−1}⋅mol^{−1}).
