= Diatomic molecule =

Molecule composed of any two atoms

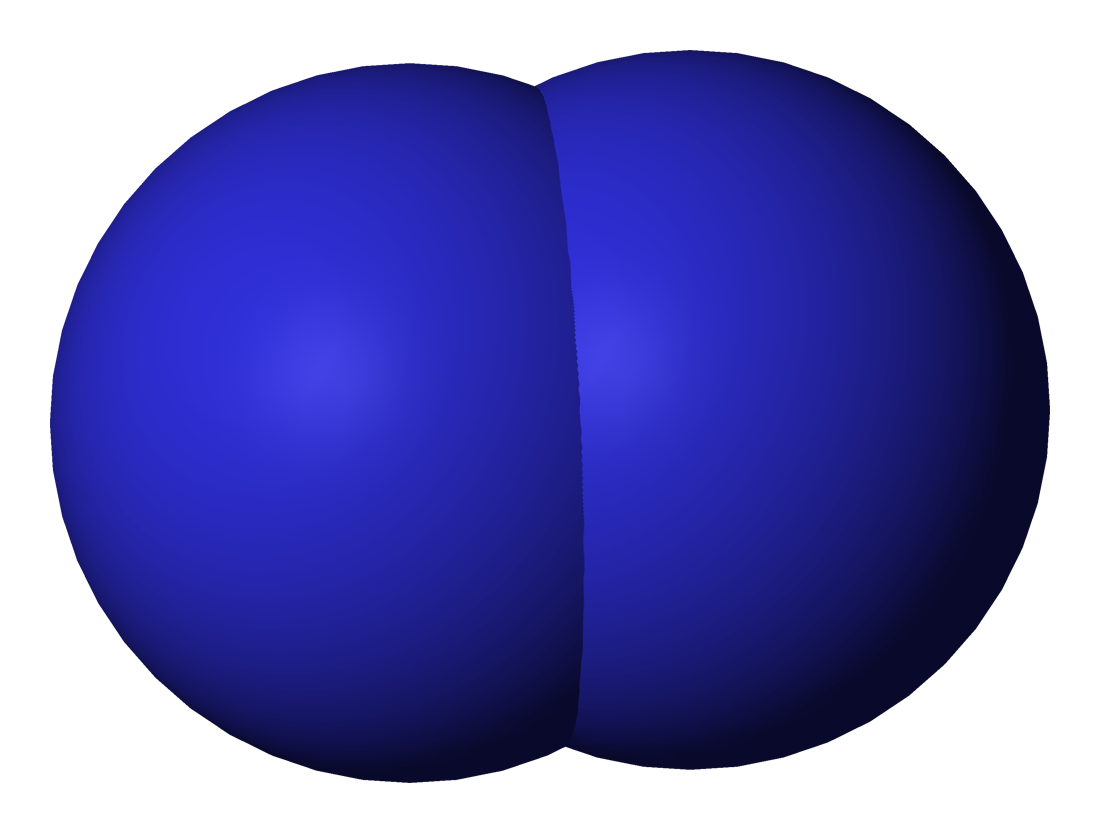
A space-filling model of the diatomic molecule dinitrogen, N_{2}

Diatomic molecules (from Greek di- 'two') are molecules composed of only two atoms, of the same or different chemical elements. If a diatomic molecule consists of two atoms of the same element, such as hydrogen (H_{2}) or oxygen (O_{2}), then it is said to be homonuclear. Otherwise, if a diatomic molecule consists of two different atoms, such as carbon monoxide (CO) or nitric oxide (NO), the molecule is said to be heteronuclear. The bond in a homonuclear diatomic molecule is non-polar.

A periodic table showing the elements that exist as homonuclear diatomic molecules under typical laboratory conditions.

The only chemical elements that form stable homonuclear diatomic molecules at standard temperature and pressure (STP) (or at typical laboratory conditions of 1 bar and 25 °C) are the gases hydrogen (H_{2}), nitrogen (N_{2}), oxygen (O_{2}), fluorine (F_{2}), and chlorine (Cl_{2}), the liquid bromine (Br_{2}), and the solid iodine (I_{2}).

The noble gases (helium, neon, argon, krypton, xenon, and radon) are also gases at STP, but they are monatomic. The homonuclear diatomic gases and noble gases together are called "elemental gases" or "molecular gases", to distinguish them from other gases that are chemical compounds.

At slightly elevated temperatures, the halogens bromine (Br_{2}) and iodine (I_{2}) also form diatomic gases. All halogens have been observed as diatomic molecules, except for astatine and tennessine, which are uncertain.

Other elements form diatomic molecules when evaporated, but these diatomic species repolymerize when cooled. Heating ("cracking") phosphorus gives diphosphorus (P_{2}). Sulfur vapor is mostly disulfur (S_{2}). Dilithium (Li_{2}) and disodium (Na_{2}) are known in the gas phase. Ditungsten (W_{2}) and dimolybdenum (Mo_{2}) form with sextuple bonds in the gas phase. Dirubidium (Rb_{2}) is diatomic.

== Heteronuclear molecules ==
All other diatomic molecules are chemical compounds of two different elements. Many elements can combine to form heteronuclear diatomic molecules, depending on temperature and pressure.

Examples are gases carbon monoxide (CO), nitric oxide (NO), and hydrogen chloride (HCl).

Many 1:1 binary compounds are not normally considered diatomic because they are polymeric at room temperature, but they form diatomic molecules when evaporated, for example gaseous MgO, SiO, and many others.

== Occurrence ==
Hundreds of diatomic molecules have been identified in the environment of the Earth, in the laboratory, and in interstellar space. About 99% of the Earth's atmosphere is composed of two species of diatomic molecules: nitrogen (78%) and oxygen (21%). The natural abundance of hydrogen (H_{2}) in the Earth's atmosphere is only of the order of parts per million, but H_{2} is the most abundant diatomic molecule in the universe. The interstellar medium is dominated by hydrogen atoms.

== Molecular geometry ==
All diatomic molecules are linear and characterized by a single parameter which is the bond length or distance between the two atoms. Diatomic nitrogen has a triple bond, diatomic oxygen has a double bond, and diatomic hydrogen, fluorine, chlorine, iodine, and bromine all have single bonds.

== Historical significance ==
Diatomic elements played an important role in the elucidation of the concepts of element, atom, and molecule in the 19th century, because some of the most common elements, such as hydrogen, oxygen, and nitrogen, occur as diatomic molecules. John Dalton's original atomic hypothesis assumed that all elements were monatomic and that the atoms in compounds would normally have the simplest atomic ratios with respect to one another. For example, Dalton assumed water's formula to be HO, giving the atomic weight of oxygen as eight times that of hydrogen, instead of the modern value of about 16. As a consequence, confusion existed regarding atomic weights and molecular formulas for about half a century.

As early as 1805, Gay-Lussac and von Humboldt showed that water is formed of two volumes of hydrogen and one volume of oxygen, and by 1811 Amedeo Avogadro had arrived at the correct interpretation of water's composition, based on what is now called Avogadro's law and the assumption of diatomic elemental molecules. However, these results were mostly ignored until 1860, partly due to the belief that atoms of one element would have no chemical affinity toward atoms of the same element, and also partly due to apparent exceptions to Avogadro's law that were not explained until later in terms of dissociating molecules.

At the 1860 Karlsruhe Congress on atomic weights, Cannizzaro resurrected Avogadro's ideas and used them to produce a consistent table of atomic weights, which mostly agree with modern values. These weights were an important prerequisite for the discovery of the periodic law by Dmitri Mendeleev and Lothar Meyer.

== Excited electronic states ==
Diatomic molecules are normally in their lowest or ground state, which conventionally is also known as the $X$ state. When a gas of diatomic molecules is bombarded by energetic electrons, some of the molecules may be excited to higher electronic states, as occurs, for example, in the natural aurora; high-altitude nuclear explosions; and rocket-borne electron gun experiments. Such excitation can also occur when the gas absorbs light or other electromagnetic radiation. The excited states are unstable and naturally relax back to the ground state. Over various short time scales after the excitation (typically a fraction of a second, or sometimes longer than a second if the excited state is metastable), transitions occur from higher to lower electronic states and ultimately to the ground state, and in each transition results a photon is emitted. This emission is known as fluorescence. Successively higher electronic states are conventionally named $A$, $B$, $C$, etc. (but this convention is not always followed, and sometimes lower case letters and alphabetically out-of-sequence letters are used, as in the example given below). The excitation energy must be greater than or equal to the energy of the electronic state in order for the excitation to occur.

In quantum theory, an electronic state of a diatomic molecule is represented by the molecular term symbol where $S$ is the total electronic spin quantum number, $\Lambda$ is the total electronic angular momentum quantum number along the internuclear axis, and $v$ is the vibrational quantum number. $\Lambda$ takes on values 0, 1, 2, ..., which are represented by the electronic state symbols $\Sigma$, $\Pi$, $\Delta$, ... For example, the following table lists the common electronic states (without vibrational quantum numbers) along with the energy of the lowest vibrational level ($v=0$) of diatomic nitrogen (N_{2}), the most abundant gas in the Earth's atmosphere.

The subscripts and superscripts after $\Lambda$ give additional quantum mechanical details about the electronic state. The superscript $+$ or $-$ determines whether reflection in a plane containing the internuclear axis introduces a sign change in the wavefunction. The sub-script $g$ or $u$ applies to molecules of identical atoms, and when reflecting the state along a plane perpendicular to the molecular axis, states that does not change are labelled $g$ (gerade), and states that change sign are labelled $u$ (ungerade).

State	Energy (Note: The "energy" units here are actually the reciprocal of the wavelength of a photon emitted in a transition to the lowest energy state. The actual energy can be found by multiplying the given statistic by the product of c (the speed of light) and h (the Planck constant); i.e., about 1.99 × 10^{−25} joule-metres, and then multiplying by a further factor of 100 to convert from cm^{−1} to m^{−1}.) ($T_0$, cm^{−1})
$X ^1\Sigma_g^+$	0.0
$A ^3\Sigma_u^+$	49754.8
$B ^3\Pi_g$	59306.8
$W ^3\Delta_u$	59380.2
$B' ^3\Sigma_u^-$	65851.3
$a' ^1\Sigma_u^-$	67739.3
$a ^1\Pi_g$	68951.2
$w ^1\Delta_u$	71698.4

The aforementioned fluorescence occurs in distinct regions of the electromagnetic spectrum, called "emission bands": each band corresponds to a particular transition from a higher electronic state and vibrational level to a lower electronic state and vibrational level (typically, many vibrational levels are involved in an excited gas of diatomic molecules). For example, N_{2} $A$-$X$ emission bands (a.k.a. Vegard-Kaplan bands) are present in the spectral range from 0.14 to 1.45 μm (micrometres). A given band can be spread out over several nanometers in electromagnetic wavelength space, owing to the various transitions that occur in the molecule's rotational quantum number, $J$. These are classified into distinct sub-band branches, depending on the change in $J$. The $R$ branch corresponds to $\Delta J = +1$, the $P$ branch to $\Delta J = -1$, and the $Q$ branch to $\Delta J = 0$. Bands are spread out even further by the limited spectral resolution of the spectrometer that is used to measure the spectrum. The spectral resolution depends on the instrument's point spread function.

== Energy levels ==
The molecular term symbol is a shorthand expression of the angular momenta that characterize the electronic quantum states of a diatomic molecule, which are also eigenstates of the electronic molecular Hamiltonian. It is also convenient, and common, to represent a diatomic molecule as two-point masses connected by a massless spring. The energies involved in the various motions of the molecule can then be broken down into three categories: the translational, rotational, and vibrational energies. The theoretical study of the rotational energy levels of the diatomic molecules can be described using the below description of the rotational energy levels. While the study of vibrational energy level of the diatomic molecules can be described using the harmonic oscillator approximation or using the quantum vibrational interaction potentials. These potentials give more accurate energy levels because they take multiple vibrational effects into account.

Concerning history, the first treatment of diatomic molecules with quantum mechanics was made by Lucy Mensing in 1926.

=== Translational energies ===
The translational energy of the molecule is given by the kinetic energy expression:
$$E_\text{trans} = \frac{1}{2}mv^2$$
where $m$ is the mass of the molecule and $v$ is its velocity.

=== Rotational energies ===
Classically, the kinetic energy of rotation is
$$E_\text{rot} = \frac{L^2}{2 I}$$
where

- $L \,$ is the angular momentum
- $I \,$ is the moment of inertia of the molecule

For microscopic, atomic-level systems like a molecule, angular momentum can only have specific discrete values given by
$$L^2 = \ell(\ell+1) \hbar^2$$
where $\ell$ is a non-negative integer and $\hbar$ is the reduced Planck constant.

Also, for a diatomic molecule the moment of inertia is
$$I = \mu r_0^2$$
where

- $\mu \,$ is the reduced mass of the molecule and
- $r_0 \,$ is the average distance between the centers of the two atoms in the molecule.

So, substituting the angular momentum and moment of inertia into E_{rot}, the rotational energy levels of a diatomic molecule are given by:
$$E_\text{rot} = \frac{\ell (\ell + 1) \hbar^2}{2 \mu r_0^2}, \quad \ell = 0, 1, 2, \dots$$

=== Vibrational energies ===
Another type of motion of a diatomic molecule is for each atom to oscillate—or vibrate—along the line connecting the two atoms. The vibrational energy is approximately that of a quantum harmonic oscillator:
$$E_\text{vib} = \left(n + \tfrac{1}{2} \right)\hbar \omega, \quad n = 0, 1, 2, \dots,$$
where

- $n$ is an integer
- $\hbar$ is the reduced Planck constant and
- $\omega$ is the angular frequency of the vibration.

=== Comparison between rotational and vibrational energy spacings ===
The spacing, and the energy of a typical spectroscopic transition, between vibrational energy levels is about 100 times greater than that of a typical transition between rotational energy levels.

== Hund's cases ==
The good quantum numbers for a diatomic molecule, as well as good approximations of rotational energy levels, can be obtained by modeling the molecule using Hund's cases.

== Mnemonics ==
The mnemonics BrINClHOF, pronounced "Brinklehof", HONClBrIF, pronounced "Honkelbrif", “HOBrFINCl”, pronounced “Hoberfinkel”, and HOFBrINCl, pronounced "Hofbrinkle", have been coined to aid recall of the list of diatomic elements. Another method, for English-speakers, is the sentence: "Never Have Fear of Ice Cold Beer" as a representation of Nitrogen, Hydrogen, Fluorine, Oxygen, Iodine, Chlorine, Bromine.

== See also ==
- Symmetry of diatomic molecules
- AXE method
- Octatomic element
- Covalent bond
- Industrial gas
