= Octatomic element =

Molecule composed of eight atoms of the same element

In chemistry, an octatomic element is an element that, at some standard temperature and pressure, is in a configuration of eight atoms bound together (a homonuclear molecule). The canonical example is sulfur, S_{8}, but red selenium is also an octatomic element stable at room temperature. Octaoxygen is also known, but it is extremely unstable.

== See also ==
- Diatomic element
