= Chemical compound =

Substance composed of multiple chemically bonded elements

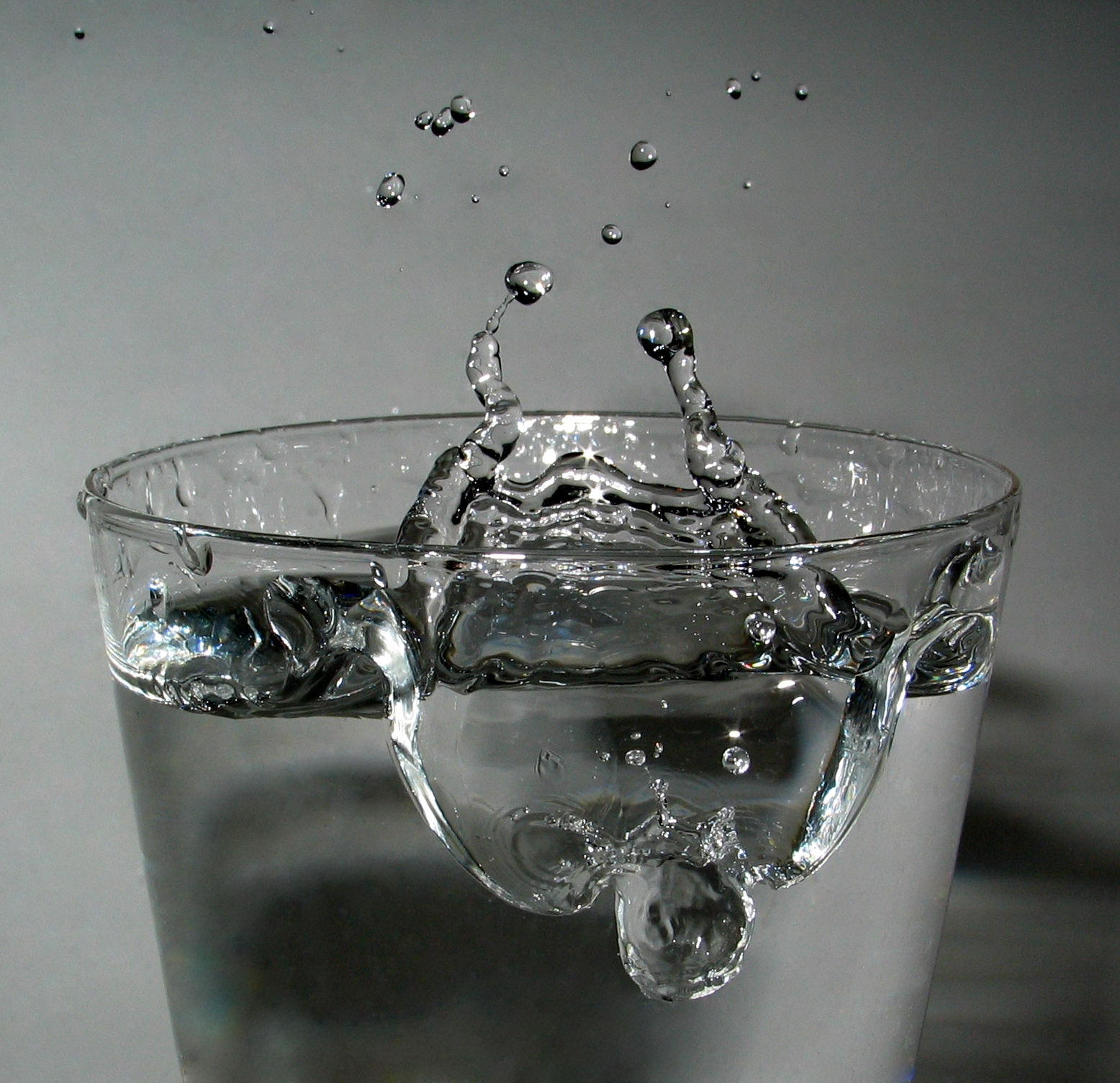
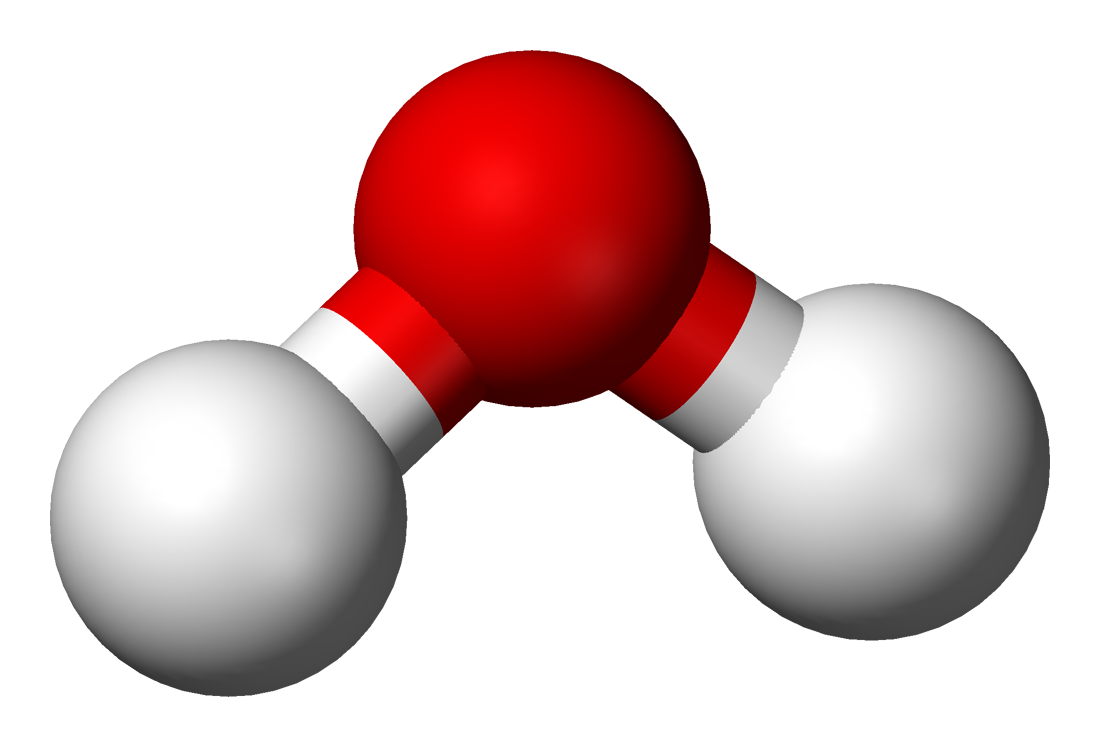
Pure water (H_{2}O) is an example of a compound. The ball-and-stick model of the molecule shows the spatial association of two parts hydrogen (white) and one part oxygen (red).

A chemical compound is a chemical substance composed of many identical molecules (or molecular entities) containing atoms from more than one chemical element held together by chemical bonds. A molecule consisting of atoms of only one element, called homonuclear molecule, is therefore not a compound. A compound can be transformed into a different substance by a chemical reaction, which may involve interactions with other substances. In this process, bonds between atoms may be broken or new bonds formed or both.

There are four major types of compounds, distinguished by how the constituent atoms are bonded together. Molecular compounds are held together by covalent bonds, ionic compounds are held together by ionic bonds, intermetallic compounds are held together by metallic bonds, and coordination complexes are held together by coordinate covalent bonds. Non-stoichiometric compounds form a disputed marginal case.

A chemical formula specifies the number of atoms of each element in a compound molecule, using the standard chemical symbols with numerical subscripts. Many chemical compounds have a unique CAS number identifier assigned by the Chemical Abstracts Service. Globally, more than 350,000 chemical compounds (including mixtures of chemicals) have been registered for production and use.

== History of the concept ==
=== Robert Boyle ===
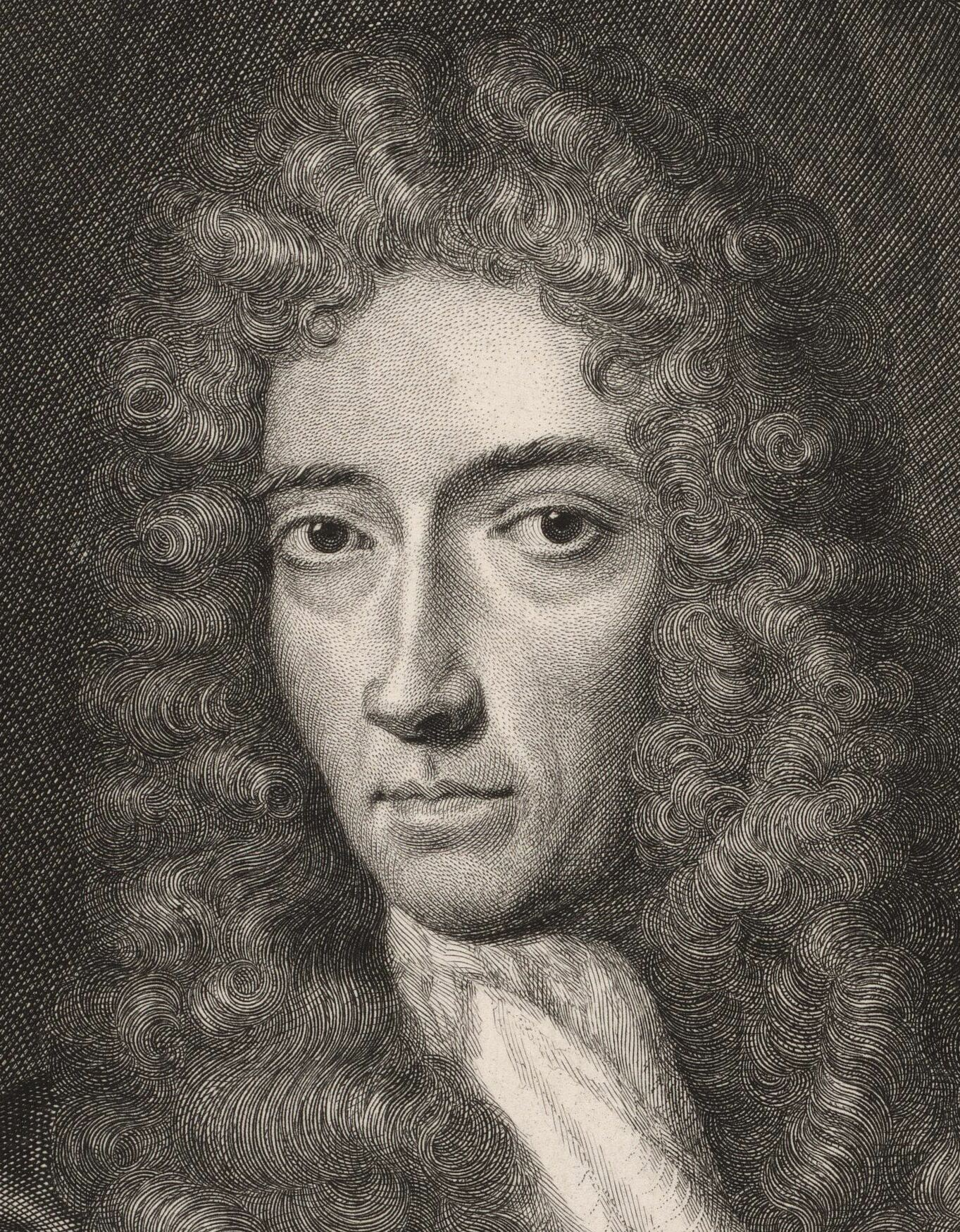
Robert Boyle

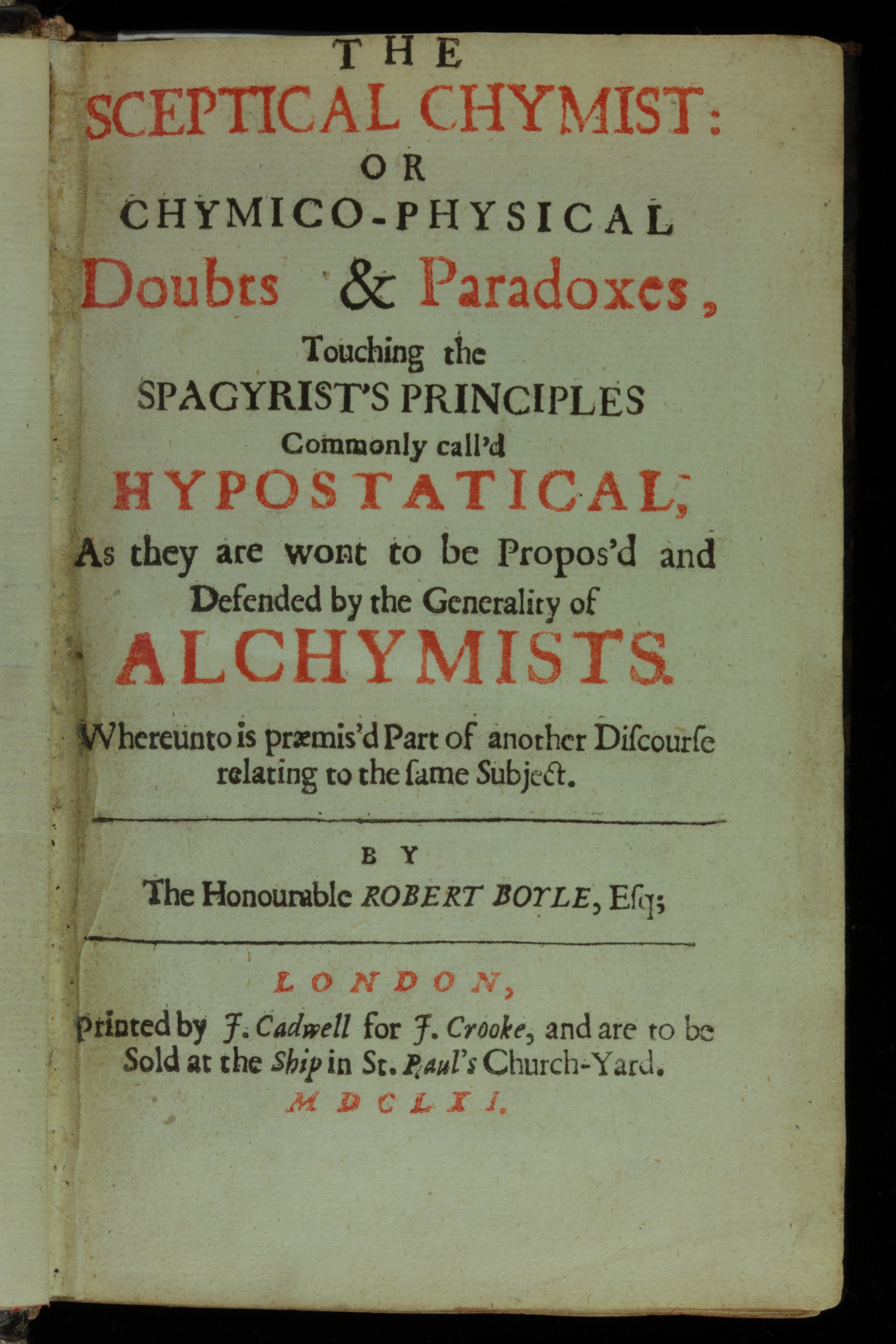
Title page of The Sceptical Chymist

The term "compound"—with a meaning similar to the modern—has been used at least since 1661 when Robert Boyle's The Sceptical Chymist was published. In this book, Boyle variously used the terms "compound", "compounded body", "perfectly mixt body", and "concrete". "Perfectly mixt bodies" included for example gold, lead, mercury, and wine. While the distinction between compound and mixture is not so clear, the distinction between element and compound is a central theme.

Quicksilver ... with Aqua fortis will be brought into a ... white Powder ... with Sulphur it will compose a blood-red and volatile Cinaber. And yet out of all these exotick Compounds, we may recover the very same running Mercury.

==== Corpuscles of elements and compounds ====
Boyle used the concept of "corpuscles"—or "atomes", as he also called them—to explain how a limited number of elements could combine into a vast number of compounds:

If we assigne to the Corpuscles, whereof each Element consists, a peculiar size and shape ... such ... Corpuscles may be mingled in such various Proportions, and ... connected so many ... wayes, that an almost incredible number of ... Concretes may be compos'd of them.

=== Isaac Watts ===
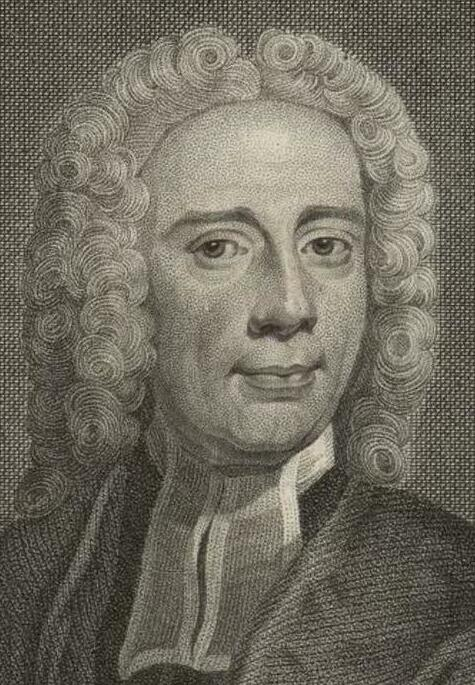
Portrait of Isaac Watts by John Shury, c. 1830

In his Logick, published in 1724, the English minister and logician Isaac Watts gave an early definition of chemical element, and contrasted element with chemical compound in clear, modern terms.

Among Substances, some are called Simple, some are Compound ... Simple Substances ... are usually called Elements, of which all other Bodies are compounded: Elements are such Substances as cannot be resolved, or reduced, into two or more Substances of different Kinds. ... Followers of Aristotle made Fire, Air, Earth and Water to be the four Elements, of which all earthly Things were compounded; and they suppos'd the Heavens to be a Quintessence, or fifth sort of Body, distinct from all these : But, since experimental Philosophy ... have been better understood, this Doctrine has been abundantly refuted. The Chymists make Spirit, Salt, Sulphur, Water and Earth to be their five Elements, because they can reduce all terrestrial Things to these five : This seems to come nearer the Truth; tho' they are not all agreed ... Compound Substances are made up of two or more simple Substances ... So a Needle is simple Body, being made only of Steel; but a Sword or a Knife is a compound because its ... Handle is made of Materials different from the Blade.

== Definitions ==
Any substance consisting of two or more different types of atoms (chemical elements) in a fixed stoichiometric proportion can be termed a chemical compound; the concept is most readily understood when considering pure chemical substances. It follows from their being composed of fixed proportions of two or more types of atoms that chemical compounds can be converted, via chemical reaction, into compounds or substances each having fewer atoms. A chemical formula is a way of expressing information about the proportions of atoms that constitute a particular chemical compound, using chemical symbols for the chemical elements, and subscripts to indicate the number of atoms involved. For example, water is composed of two hydrogen atoms bonded to one oxygen atom: the chemical formula is H_{2}O. In the case of non-stoichiometric compounds, the proportions may be reproducible with regard to their preparation, and give fixed proportions of their component elements, but proportions that are not integral [e.g., for palladium hydride, PdH_{x} (0.02 < x < 0.58)].

Chemical compounds have a unique and defined chemical structure held together in a defined spatial arrangement by chemical bonds. Chemical compounds can be molecular compounds held together by covalent bonds, salts held together by ionic bonds, intermetallic compounds held together by metallic bonds, or the subset of chemical complexes that are held together by coordinate covalent bonds. Pure chemical elements are generally not considered chemical compounds, failing the two or more atom requirement, though they often consist of molecules composed of multiple atoms (such as in the diatomic molecule H_{2}, or the polyatomic molecule S_{8}, etc.). Many chemical compounds have a unique numerical identifier assigned by the Chemical Abstracts Service (CAS): its CAS number.

There is varying and sometimes inconsistent nomenclature differentiating substances, which include truly non-stoichiometric examples, from chemical compounds, which require the fixed ratios. Many solid chemical substances—for example many silicate minerals—are chemical substances, but do not have simple formulae reflecting chemical bonding of elements to one another in fixed ratios; even so, these crystalline substances are often called "non-stoichiometric compounds". It may be argued that they are related to, rather than being chemical compounds, insofar as the variability in their compositions is often due to either the presence of foreign elements trapped within the crystal structure of an otherwise known true chemical compound, or due to perturbations in structure relative to the known compound that arise because of an excess or deficit of the constituent elements at places in its structure; such non-stoichiometric substances form most of the crust and mantle of the Earth. Other compounds regarded as chemically identical may have varying amounts of heavy or light isotopes of the constituent elements, which changes the ratio of elements by mass slightly.

== Types ==
=== Molecules ===
A molecule is an electrically neutral group of two or more atoms held together by chemical bonds. A molecule may be homonuclear, that is, it consists of atoms of one chemical element, as with two atoms in the oxygen molecule (O_{2}); or it may be heteronuclear, a chemical compound composed of more than one element, as with water (two hydrogen atoms and one oxygen atom; H_{2}O). A molecule is the smallest unit of a substance that still carries all the physical and chemical properties of that substance.

=== Ionic compounds ===
An ionic compound is a chemical compound composed of ions held together by electrostatic forces; this is termed ionic bonding. The compound is neutral overall, but consists of positively charged ions, called cations, and negatively charged ions, called anions. These can be simple ions such as the sodium (Na^{+}) and chloride (Cl^{−}) in sodium chloride, or polyatomic species such as the ammonium (NH^{+}_{4}) and carbonate (CO^{2−}_{3}) ions in ammonium carbonate. Individual ions within an ionic compound usually have multiple nearest neighbours, so are not considered to be part of molecules, but instead part of a continuous three-dimensional network, usually in a crystalline structure.

Ionic compounds containing basic ions, like hydroxide (OH^{−}) or oxide (O^{2−}), are classified as bases. Ionic compounds without these ions are also known as salts and can be formed by acid–base reactions. Ionic compounds can also be produced from their constituent ions by evaporation of their solvent, precipitation, freezing, a solid-state reaction, or the electron transfer reaction of reactive metals with reactive non-metals, such as halogen gases.

Ionic compounds typically have high melting and boiling points, and are hard and brittle. As solids they are almost always electrically insulating, but when melted or dissolved they become highly conductive, because the ions are mobilized.

=== Intermetallic compounds ===
An intermetallic compound is a type of metallic alloy that forms an ordered solid-state compound between two or more metallic elements. Intermetallics are generally hard and brittle, with good high-temperature mechanical properties. They can be classified as stoichiometric or nonstoichiometric intermetallic compounds.

=== Complexes ===
A coordination complex consists of a central atom or ion, which is usually metallic and is called the coordination centre, and a surrounding array of bound molecules or ions, that are in turn known as ligands or complexing agents. Many metal-containing compounds, especially those of transition metals, are coordination complexes.

== Bonding and forces ==
Compounds are held together through a variety of different types of bonding and forces. The differences in the types of bonds in compounds differ based on the types of elements present in the compound.

London dispersion forces, part of the Van der Waals force, are the weakest force of all intermolecular forces. They are temporary attractive forces that form when the electrons in two adjacent atoms are positioned so that they create a temporary dipole. London dispersion forces can create Van der Waals molecules. Additionally, they are responsible for condensing nonpolar substances to liquids, and to further freeze to a solid state dependent on how low the temperature of the environment is.

A covalent bond, also known as a molecular bond, involves the sharing of electrons between two atoms. Primarily, this type of bond occurs between elements that fall close to each other on the periodic table of elements, yet it is observed between some metals and nonmetals. This is due to the mechanism of this type of bond. Elements that fall close to each other on the periodic table tend to have similar electronegativities, which means they have a similar affinity for electrons. Since neither element has a stronger affinity to donate or gain electrons, it causes the elements to share electrons so both elements have a more stable octet.

Ionic bonding occurs when valence electrons are completely transferred between elements. Opposite to covalent bonding, this chemical bond creates two oppositely charged ions. The metals in ionic bonding usually lose their valence electrons, becoming a positively charged cation. The nonmetal will gain the electrons from the metal, making the nonmetal a negatively charged anion. As outlined, ionic bonds occur between an electron donor, usually a metal, and an electron acceptor, which tends to be a nonmetal.

Hydrogen bonding occurs when a hydrogen atom bonded to an electronegative atom forms an electrostatic connection with another electronegative atom through interacting dipoles or charges.

== Reactions ==
A compound can be converted to a different chemical composition by interaction with a second chemical compound via a chemical reaction. In this process, bonds between atoms are broken in both of the interacting compounds, and then bonds are reformed so that new associations are made between atoms. Schematically, this reaction could be described as AB + CD → AD + CB, where A, B, C, and D are each unique atoms; and AB, AD, CD, and CB are each unique compounds.

== See also ==
- Chemical structure
- IUPAC nomenclature
- Dictionary of chemical formulas
- List of compounds

== Sources ==
- Boyle, R. (1661). The Sceptical Chymist: or Chymico-Physical Doubts & Paradoxes, Touching the Spagyrist's Principles Commonly call'd Hypostatical; As they are wont to be Propos'd and Defended by the Generality of Alchymists. Whereunto is præmis'd Part of another Discourse relating to the same Subject. Printed by J. Cadwell for J. Crooke.
