= Dirubidium =

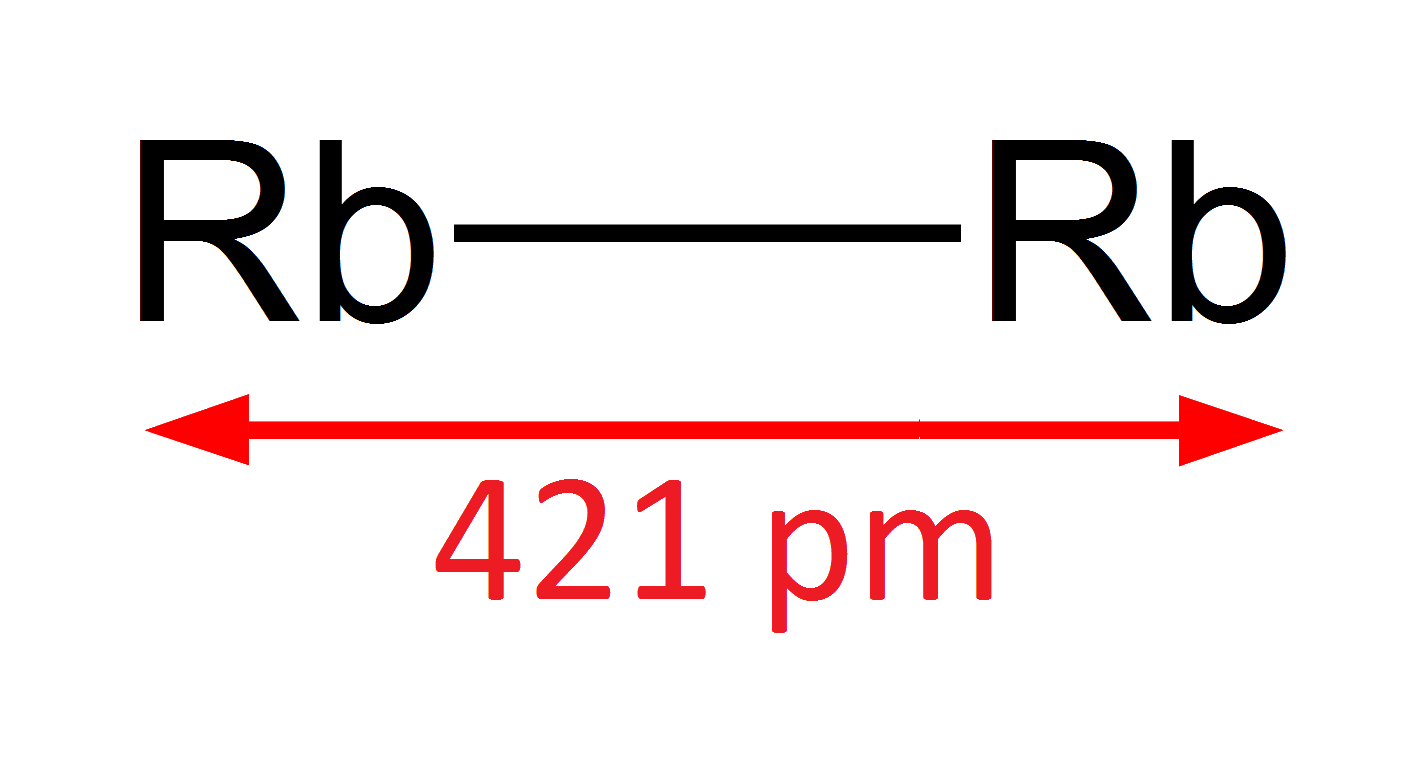

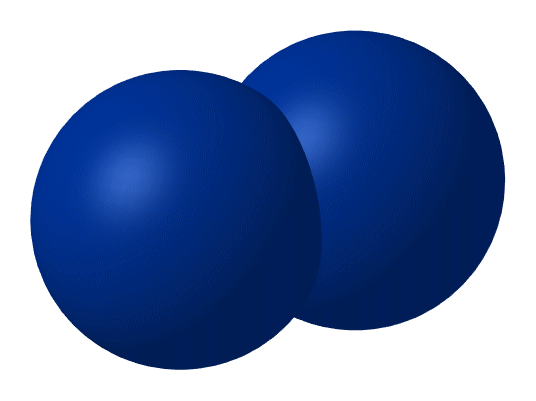

Identifiers
| CAS Number | 25681-81-6 |
| 3D model (JSmol) | Interactive image |
| ChemSpider | 4937536 |
| PubChem CID | 6432277 |
- InChI: InChI=1S/2Rb Key: MQZGYYYBCTXEME-UHFFFAOYSA-N
- SMILES: [Rb][Rb]

Properties
| Chemical formula | Rb_{2} |
| Molar mass | 170.9356 g·mol^{−1} |

Hazards
- Occupational safety and health (OHS/OSH)
| Main hazards | Flammable |
- Except where otherwise noted, data are given for materials in their standard state (at 25 °C [77 °F], 100 kPa). Infobox references

Dirubidium is a molecular substance containing two atoms of rubidium found in rubidium vapour. Dirubidium has two active valence electrons. It is studied both in theory and with experiment. The rubidium trimer has also been observed.

== Synthesis and properties ==
Dirubidium is produced when rubidium vapour is chilled. The enthalpy of formation (Δ_{f}H^{°}) in the gas phase is 113.29 kJ/mol. In practice, an oven heated to 600 to 800K with a nozzle can squirt out vapour that condenses into dimers. The proportion of Rb_{2} in rubidium vapour varies with its density, which depends on the temperature. At 200° the partial pressure of Rb_{2} is only 0.4%, at 400 °C it constitutes 1.6% of the pressure, and at 677 °C the dimer has 7.4% of the vapour pressure (13.8% by mass).

The rubidium dimer has been formed on the surface of helium nanodroplets when two rubidium atoms combine to yield the dimer:

Rb + Rb → Rb_{2}

Rb_{2} has also been produced in solid helium matrix under pressure.

Ultracold rubidium atoms can be stored in a magneto-optic trap and then photoassociated to form molecules in an excited state, vibrating at a rate so high they barely hang together. In solid matrix traps, Rb_{2} can combine with the host atoms when excited to form exciplexes, for example Rb_{2}(^{3}Π_{u})He_{2} in a solid helium matrix.

Ultracold rubidium dimers are being produced in order to observe quantum effects on well-defined molecules. It is possible to produce a set of molecules all rotating on the same axis with the lowest vibrational level.

== Spectrum ==
Dirubidium has several excited states, and spectral bands occur for transitions between these levels, combined with vibration. It can be studied by its absorption lines, or by laser induced-fluorescence. Laser induced-fluorescence can reveal the life-times of excited states.

In the absorption spectrum of rubidium vapour, Rb_{2} has a major effect. Single atoms of rubidium in the vapour cause lines in the spectrum, but the dimer causes wider bands to appear. The most severe absorption between 640 and 730 nm makes the vapour almost opaque from 670 to 700 nm, wiping out the far red end of the spectrum. This is the band due to X→B transition. From 430 to 460 nm there is a shark-fin shaped absorption feature due to X→E transitions. Another shark fin like effect around 475 nm s due to X→D transitions. There is also a small hump with peaks at 601, 603 and 605.5 nm 1→3 triplet transitions and connected to the diffuse series. There are a few more small absorption features in the near infrared.

There is also a dirubidium cation, Rb_{2}^{+} with different spectroscopic properties.

=== Bands ===
| Transition | Colour | Known vibrational bands | Bandheads |
|---|---|---|---|
| A-X | infrared | | |
| B-X | red | 4-0 5-0 6-0 7-0 8-0 9-0 10-0 11-0 6-1 7-1 8-1 9-2 | 14847.080 to 15162.002 |
| C-X | blue | | |
| D-X | blue-violet | | |
| 1-C | infrared | | |
| C→2 | 6800–8000 cm^{−1} | | |
| 1^{1}Δ_{g}-X | 540 nm quadrupole | | |

=== Molecular constants for excited states ===
The following table has parameters for ^{85}Rb^{85}Rb the most common for the natural element.

| Parameter | T_{e} | ω_{e} | ω_{e}x_{e} | ω_{e}y_{e} | B_{e} | α_{e} | γ_{e} | D_{e} | β_{e} | r_{e} | ν_{00} | R_{e} Å | ref |
|---|---|---|---|---|---|---|---|---|---|---|---|---|---|
| 3^{1}Σ_{g}^{+} | | | | | | | | | | | | 5.4 Å | |
| 4^{3}^{+}_{u} 5s+6s | | | | | | | | | | | | | |
| 3^{3}Δ_{u} 5s+4d | | | | | | | | | | | | | |
| 3^{3}Π_{u} 5s + 6p | 22 610.27 | 41.4 | | | | | | | | | | | |
| 2^{3}Π_{u} | 19805.2 | 42.0 | | | 0.01841 | | | | | | | 4.6 | |
| 1^{3}Σ_{g} 5p+5s | | | | | | | | | | | | | |
| 1^{3}Σ_{u} 5p+5s | | | | | | | | weak | | | | | |
| 1^{3}Π_{u} 5p+5s | | | | | | | | | | | | | |
| 2_{g} | 13029.29 | | | | 0.01568 | | | | | | | 5.0 | |
| 1_{g} | 13008.610 | | | | 0.0158 | | | | | | | 5.05 | |
| 0^{−}_{g} | 12980.840 | | | | 0.0151 | | | | | | | 5.05 | |
| 0^{+}_{g} inner | 12979.282 | | | | 0.015489 | | | | | | | 5.1 | |
| 0^{+}_{g} outer | 13005.612 | | | | 0.00478 | | | | | | | 9.2 | |
| 0^{+}_{u} | | | | | | | | | | | | | |
| c^{3}Σ_{u}^{+} (unbound) 5p^{2}P_{3/2} | | | | | | | | | | | | | |
| b^{3}Π_{u} | | | | | | | | | | | | | |
| b^{3}Π_{0u^{+}} | 9600.83 | 60.10 | | | | | | | | | | 4.13157 Å | |
| a^{3}Σ_{u}^{+} metastable triplet | | | | | | | | | | | | | |
| a^{3}Π_{u} triplet ground state | | | | | | | | | | | | | |
| 14^{1}Σ_{g}^{+} | 30121.0 | 44.9 | | | 0.01166 | | | | | | | | pred |
| 13^{1}Σ_{g}^{+} | 28 863.0 | 46.1 | | | 0.01673 | | | | | | | | pred |
| 12^{1}Σ_{g}^{+} | 28 533.9 | 38.4 | | | 0.01656 | | | | | | | | pred |
| 11^{1}Σ_{g}^{+} | 28 349.9 | 42.0 | | | 0.01721 | | | | | | | | pred |
| 10^{1}Σ_{g}^{+} | 27 433.1 | 45.3 | | | 0.01491 | | | | | | | | pred |
| 9^{1}Σ_{g}^{+} | 26 967.1 | 45.1 | | | 0.01768 | | | | | | | | pred |
| 8^{1}Σ_{g}^{+} | 26 852.9 | 44.6 | | | 0.01724 | | | | | | | | pred |
| 7^{1}Σ_{g}^{+} | 25 773.9 | 76.7 | | | 0.01158 | | | | | | | | pred |
| 6^{1}Σ_{g}^{+} | 24 610.8 | 46.3 | | | 0.01800 | | | | | | | | pred |
| 11^{1}Σ_{u}^{+} | 29 709.4 | 41.7 | | | 0.01623 | | | | | | | | pred |
| 10^{1}Σ_{u}^{+} | 29 339.2 | 35.0 | | | 0.016 85 | | | | | | | | pred |
| 9^{1}Σ_{u}^{+} | 28 689.9 | 43.6 | | | 0.01661 | | | | | | | | pred |
| 8^{1}Σ_{u}^{+} | 28 147.3 | 51.5 | | | 0.01588 | | | | | | | | pred |
| 7^{1}Σ_{u}^{+} | 27 716.8 | 44.5 | | | 0.01636 | | | | | | | | pred |
| 6^{1}Σ_{u}^{+} | 26 935.8 | 49.6 | | | 0.01341 | | | | | | | | pred |
| 5^{1}Σ_{u}^{+} | 26108.8 | 39 | | | 0.016 47 | | | | | | | 4.9 | |
| 5^{1}Π_{u} | 26131 | | | | | | | | | | | 4.95 | |
| 4^{1}Σ_{u}^{+} | 24 800.8 | 10.7 | | | 0.00298 | | | | | | | | pred |
| 4^{1}Σ_{g}^{+} | 20004.13 | 61.296 | | | 0.01643 | | | | | | | | |
| 3^{1}Σ_{u}^{+} 5s+6s | 22 405.2 | 40.2 | | | 0.015 536 | | | | | | | | |
| 3^{1}Π_{u} = D^{1}Π_{u} 5s + 6p | 22777.53 | 36.255 | | | 0.01837 | | | 5008.59 | | | | 4.9 Å | |
| 2^{1}Σ_{g}^{+} | 13601.58 | 31.4884 | -0.01062 | | 0.013430 | -0.0000018924 | | 2963 | | | | 5.4379 | |
| 2^{1}Σ_{u}^{+} 6s+4d | | | | | | | | | | | | 5.5 (vibration causes a large stretching) | |
| 2^{1}Π_{u} = C^{1}Π_{u} | 20 913.18 | 36.255 | | | 0.01837 | | | | | | | | |
| 2^{1}Π_{g} | 22 084.9 | 30.6 | | | 0.01441 | | | | | | | | |
| 1^{1}Δ_{g} | | | | | | | | | | | | | |
| 1^{1}Π_{u} | | | | | | | | | | | | | |
| 1^{1}Π_{g} | 15510.28 | 22.202 | -0.1525 | | 0.013525 | -0.0001209 | | 1290 cm^{−1} | | | | 5.418 | |
| B^{1}Π_{u} 5s+5p | 14665.44 | 47.4316 | 0.1533 | 0.0060 | 0.01999 | 0.000070 | | 1.4 | | | | | |
| A^{1}Σ_{u}^{+} 5s+5p | 10749.742 | 44.58 | | | | | | | | | | 4.87368 Å | |
| X^{1}Σ_{g}^{+} 5s+5s | 12816 | 57.7467 | 0.1582 | 0.0015 | 0.02278 | 0.000047 | | 1.5/3986 cm^{−1} | | | | 4.17 | |

== Related species ==
The other alkali metals also form dimers: dilithium Li_{2}, Na_{2}, K_{2}, and Cs_{2}. The rubidium trimer has also been observed on the surface of helium nanodroplets. The trimer, Rb_{3} has the shape of an equilateral triangle, bond length of 5.52 A˚ and a binding energy of 929 cm^{−1}.
