= Heteronuclear molecule =

Type of molecule

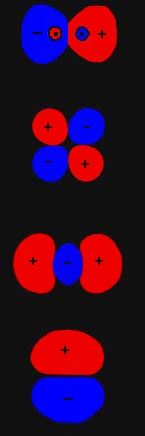
Heteronuclear molecules

A heteronuclear molecule is a molecule composed of atoms of more than one chemical element. For example, a molecule of water (H_{2}O) is heteronuclear because it has atoms of two different elements, hydrogen (H) and oxygen (O).

Similarly, a heteronuclear ion is an ion that contains atoms of more than one chemical element. For example, the carbonate ion (CO^{2−}_{3}) is heteronuclear because it has atoms of carbon (C) and oxygen (O). The lightest heteronuclear ion is the helium hydride ion (HeH^{+}). This is in contrast to a homonuclear ion, which contains all the same kind of atom, such as the dihydrogen cation, or atomic ions that only contain one atom such as the hydrogen anion (H^{−}).

== See also ==
- Homonuclear molecule
- Chemical compound
