= Homonuclear molecule =

Molecule composed of one element

In chemistry, homonuclear molecules, or elemental molecules, or homonuclear species, are molecules composed of only one element. Homonuclear molecules may consist of various numbers of atoms. The size of the molecule an element can form depends on the element's properties, and some elements form molecules of more than one size. The most familiar homonuclear molecules are diatomic molecules, which consist of two atoms, although not all diatomic molecules are homonuclear. Common homonuclear diatomic molecules include hydrogen (H_{2}), oxygen (O_{2}), nitrogen (N_{2}) and all of the halogens. Ozone (O_{3}) is a common triatomic homonuclear molecule. Homonuclear tetratomic molecules include yellow arsenic (As_{4}) and white phosphorus (P_{4}).

The concept of homonuclear molecules is closely related to that of allotropes - allotropes are different chemical forms of the same element (not containing any other element), and many elements have multiple allotropic forms. All allotropes are by definition homonuclear, however the designation as homonuclear molecule is normally reserved for the chemical forms that form discrete molecules - allotropes that take the form of e.g. metallic or network solids are normally excluded. For example:

- Sulfur forms several allotropes consisting of molecules with distinct numbers of sulfur atoms, such as diatomic, triatomic, hexatomic and octatomic (S_{2}, S_{3}, S_{6}, S_{8}) forms (though the first three are rare) - all of these are homonuclear molecules. Sulfur also forms long polymeric catena allotropes which are not considered homonuclear molecules.
- For carbon, allotropes such as graphite and diamond are network solids and therefore not considered homonuclear molecules. However, some of the more exotic allotropes of carbon such as e.g. fullerenes and cyclocarbons do form homonuclear molecules.
- For phosphorus, white phosphorus forms homonuclear molecules, while red and black phosphorus form extended networks instead.

Sometimes a cluster of atoms of a single kind of metallic element is considered a single molecule.

== See also ==
- Heteronuclear molecule
- Category:Homonuclear diatomic molecules
- Category:Homonuclear triatomic molecules
