= J. C. Decius =

American physicist and professor

- Born: John Courtney Decius; February 13, 1920
- Died: September 5, 1994 (aged 74)
- Education: Stanford University; Harvard University
- Awards: Fellow, American Physical Society
- Scientific career
- Workplaces: Oregon State University
- Thesis: I. Vibrational Potential Functions for Several Halomethanes and Halo-Ethanes II. The Principles of Dimensional Analysis and Scaled Models
- Doctoral advisor: Edgar Bright Wilson

John Courtney "Jack" Decius (1920 – 1994) was an American physical chemist, molecular spectroscopist, and researcher on the faculty of Oregon State College. He made significant contributions to the study of vibrational spectra, dipole and ion interactions, and infrared and Raman spectroscopy of crystals and ionic species.

== Early life and education ==
John C. Decius was born Feb. 13, 1920, in San Francisco, the son of Lewis Courtney Decius and Grace (Towne) Decius. In 1941 he took his baccalaureate degree in chemistry at Stanford, and in 1947 earned his Ph.D. at Harvard, with a dissertation titled, I. Vibrational Potential Functions for Several Halomethanes and Halo-Ethanes II. The Principles of Dimensional Analysis and Scaled Models, advised by Edgar Bright Wilson.

Decius married Anne Streeter in 1948, and they raised a son, Peter S. Decius, and daughters Joyce S. Decius Lowry and Sylvia Russell. They had three grandchildren.

Decius died in 1994, due to injuries sustained in an auto accident.

== Career ==
Decius became a professor of chemistry at Oregon State College in 1949. He retired as a designated "Distinguished Professor" in 1981.

== Selected publications ==
=== Books ===
- Decius, John Courtney; Hexter, Robert Maurice (1977). Molecular vibrations in crystals. New York: McGraw-Hill. ISBN 978-0-07-028615-3.
- Wilson, E. B.; Decius, J. C.; Cross, P. C. (1980). Molecular Vibrations: The Theory of Infrared and Raman Vibrational Spectra. Italy: Dover Publications.

=== Articles ===
1. Molecular topology, coordinates, and compliance matrix

- Decius, J. C. (1949-12-01). "Complete Sets and Redundancies among Small Vibrational Coordinates". The Journal of Chemical Physics. 17 (12): 1315–1318. doi:10.1063/1.1747158. ISSN 0021-9606.
- Decius, J. C. (1963-01-01). "Compliance Matrix and Molecular Vibrations". The Journal of Chemical Physics. 38 (1): 241–248. doi:10.1063/1.1733469. ISSN 0021-9606.

2. Isotopic substitution rules and force constant determination

- Decius, J. C. (1948-03-01). "Force Constants for Some Halomethanes". The Journal of Chemical Physics. 16 (3): 214–223. doi:10.1063/1.1746840. ISSN 0021-9606.
- Decius, J. C. (1952-03-01). "The Use of Isotopic Molecules for the Complete Determination of Force Constants. I. Linear Molecules". The Journal of Chemical Physics. 20 (3): 511–516. doi:10.1063/1.1700448. ISSN 0021-9606.

3. Infrared intensities and the effective charge flux model

- Decius, J. C. "An effective atomic charge model for infrared intensities" J. Mol. Spectrosc., 57(3), 346–362 (1975).Vol.57(3), 346–362 (1975).
- Decius, J. C.; Mast, George B. (May 1978). "Atomic polar tensors and the effective charge-charge flux model of infrared intensities". Journal of Molecular Spectroscopy. 70 (2): 294–306. doi:10.1016/0022-2852(78)90165-0. ISSN 0022-2852.

4. Vibrational dynamics and excitons in crystals

- Carlson, R. E.; Decius, J. C. (1973-06-01). "Dipolar coupling and molecular vibrations in crystals. V. Correlation of microscopic and macroscopic theory". The Journal of Chemical Physics. 58 (11): 4919–4923. doi:10.1063/1.1679078. ISSN 0021-9606.

5. Raman intensity metrics, nonlinear hyper-Raman selection rules

- Cyvin, S. J.; Rauch, J. E.; Decius, J. C. (1965-12-01). "Theory of Hyper-Raman Effects (Nonlinear Inelastic Light Scattering): Selection Rules and Depolarization Ratios for the Second-Order Polarizability". The Journal of Chemical Physics. 43 (11): 4083–4095. doi:10.1063/1.1696646. ISSN 0021-9606.

6. Specialized polyatomic systems and experimental diagnostics

- Steele, W. C.; Decius, J. C. (1956-12-01). "Infrared Absorption of Lanthanum, Scandium, and Indium Borate and the Force Constants of Borate Ion". The Journal of Chemical Physics. 25 (6): 1184–1188. doi:10.1063/1.1743175. ISSN 0021-9606.
- Woodmansee, W. E.; Decius, J. C. (1962-04-01). "Vibrational Relaxation in Carbon Monoxide by the Spectrophone Frequency-Response Method". The Journal of Chemical Physics. 36 (7): 1831–1837. doi:10.1063/1.1701276. ISSN 0021-9606.

== Awards and honors ==
- 1955 – Guggenheim Fellow
- 1955-56 – Fulbright Fellow
- 1956 – Sloan Fellow
- 1962 – Fellow of the American Physical Society
- 1965 – OSU Alumni Distinguished Professor Award
