= Atomic, molecular, and optical physics =

Study of matter-light interactions at small scales

Atomic, molecular, and optical physics (AMO) is the study of matter–matter and light–matter interactions, at the scale of one or a few atoms and energy scales around several electron volts. The three areas are closely interrelated. AMO theory includes classical, semi-classical and quantum treatments. Typically, the theory and applications of emission, absorption, scattering of electromagnetic radiation (light) from excited atoms and molecules, analysis of spectroscopy, generation of lasers and masers, and the optical properties of matter in general, fall into these categories.

== Atomic and molecular physics ==
Atomic physics is the subfield of AMO that studies atoms as an isolated system of electrons and an atomic nucleus, while molecular physics is the study of the physical properties of molecules. The term atomic physics is often associated with nuclear power and nuclear bombs, due to the synonymous use of atomic and nuclear in standard English. However, physicists distinguish between atomic physics — which deals with the atom as a system consisting of a nucleus and electrons — and nuclear physics, which considers atomic nuclei alone. While nuclear physicists concern themselves primarily with techniques to investigate atomic nuclei like particle accelerators, AMO physicists tend to be more interested in techniques in spectroscopy. Within AMO physics, many are interested in the study of molecular physics. Although this field is related to atomic physics, there are also additional degrees of freedom that create more complicated Hamiltonians with interesting underlying physics. Molecular physics also has significant overlap with the fields of theoretical chemistry, physical chemistry and chemical physics.

Both subfields are primarily concerned with electronic structure and the dynamical processes by which these arrangements change. The way that this is studied is by characterizing the system's Hamiltonian and understanding the energy levels of the system. Understanding the dynamics of these systems, particularly for molecules, is known as quantum chemistry. To probe the structure of these atoms and molecules, physicists use atomic orbital and molecular orbital theory to understand the electronic structure. Notably in molecular physics, understanding the electronic properities of your respective molecule will tell you the leading order effect in the energy contribution in the Born-Oppenheimer approximation of a molecules Hamiltonian.

Molecular physics is concerned with atomic processes in molecules, but it is also concerned with effects due to the molecular structure. In addition to the electronic excitation states which are known from atoms, molecules are able to rotate and to vibrate. These rotations and vibrations are quantized; there are discrete energy levels. The smallest energy differences exist between different rotational states, therefore pure rotational spectra are in the far infrared region (about 30 - 150 μm wavelength) of the electromagnetic spectrum. Vibrational spectra are in the near infrared (about 1 - 5 μm) and spectra resulting from electronic transitions are mostly in the visible and ultraviolet regions. From measuring rotational and vibrational spectra properties of molecules like the distance between the nuclei can be calculated.

As with many scientific fields, strict delineation can be highly contrived and atomic physics is often considered in the wider context of atomic, molecular, and optical physics. Physics research groups are usually so classified.

== Optical physics ==
Optical physics is the study of the generation of electromagnetic radiation, the properties of that radiation, and the interaction of that radiation with matter, especially its manipulation and control. It differs from general optics and optical engineering in that it is focused on the discovery and application of new phenomena. There is no strong distinction, however, between optical physics, applied optics, and optical engineering, since the devices of optical engineering and the applications of applied optics are necessary for basic research in optical physics, and that research leads to the development of new devices and applications. Often the same people are involved in both the basic research and the applied technology development, for example the experimental demonstration of electromagnetically induced transparency by S. E. Harris and of slow light by Harris and Lene Vestergaard Hau.

Researchers in optical physics use and develop light sources that span the electromagnetic spectrum from microwaves to X-rays. The field includes the generation and detection of light, linear and nonlinear optical processes, and spectroscopy. Lasers and laser spectroscopy have transformed optical science. Major study in optical physics is also devoted to quantum optics and coherence, and to femtosecond optics. In optical physics, support is also provided in areas such as the nonlinear response of isolated atoms to intense, ultra-short electromagnetic fields, the atom-cavity interaction at high fields, and quantum properties of the electromagnetic field.

Other important areas of research include the development of novel optical techniques for nano-optical measurements, diffractive optics, low-coherence interferometry, optical coherence tomography, and near-field microscopy. Research in optical physics places an emphasis on ultrafast optical science and technology. The applications of optical physics create advancements in communications, medicine, manufacturing, and even entertainment.

== History ==
The Bohr model of the Hydrogen atom

One of the earliest steps towards atomic physics was the recognition that matter was composed of atoms, in modern terms the basic unit of a chemical element. This theory was developed by John Dalton in the 18th century. At this stage, it wasn't clear what atoms were - although they could be described and classified by their observable properties in bulk; summarized by the developing periodic table, by John Newlands and Dmitri Mendeleyev around the mid to late 19th century.

Later, the connection between atomic physics and optical physics became apparent, by the discovery of spectral lines and attempts to describe the phenomenon - notably by Joseph von Fraunhofer, Fresnel, and others in the 19th century.

From that time to the 1920s, physicists were seeking to explain atomic spectra and blackbody radiation. One attempt to explain hydrogen spectral lines was the Bohr atom model.

Experiments including electromagnetic radiation and matter - such as the photoelectric effect, Compton effect, and spectra of sunlight the due to the unknown element of Helium, the limitation of the Bohr model to Hydrogen, and numerous other reasons, lead to an entirely new mathematical model of matter and light: quantum mechanics.

=== Classical oscillator model of matter ===
Early models to explain the origin of the index of refraction treated an electron in an atomic system classically according to the model of Paul Drude and Hendrik Lorentz. The theory was developed to attempt to provide an origin for the wavelength-dependent refractive index n of a material. In this model, incident electromagnetic waves forced an electron bound to an atom to oscillate. The amplitude of the oscillation would then have a relationship to the frequency of the incident electromagnetic wave and the resonant frequencies of the oscillator. The superposition of these emitted waves from many oscillators would then lead to a wave which moved more slowly.

=== Early quantum model of matter and light ===
Max Planck derived a formula to describe the electromagnetic field inside a box when in thermal equilibrium in 1900. His model consisted of a superposition of standing waves. In one dimension, the box has length L, and only sinusoidal waves of wavenumber

$$k = \frac{n\pi}{L}$$

can occur in the box, where n is a positive integer (mathematically denoted by $\scriptstyle n \in \mathbb{N}_1$). The equation describing these standing waves is given by:

$$E=E_0 \sin\left(\frac{n\pi}{L}x\right)\,\!$$.

where E_{0} is the magnitude of the electric field amplitude, and E is the magnitude of the electric field at position x. From this basic, Planck's law was derived.

In 1911, Ernest Rutherford concluded, based on alpha particle scattering, that an atom has a central pointlike proton. He also thought that an electron would be still attracted to the proton by Coulomb's law, which he had verified still held at small scales. As a result, he believed that electrons revolved around the proton. Niels Bohr, in 1913, combined the Rutherford model of the atom with the quantisation ideas of Planck. Only specific and well-defined orbits of the electron could exist, which also do not radiate light. In jumping orbit the electron would emit or absorb light corresponding to the difference in energy of the orbits. His prediction of the energy levels was then consistent with observation.

These results, based on a discrete set of specific standing waves, were inconsistent with the continuous classical oscillator model.

Work by Albert Einstein in 1905 on the photoelectric effect led to the association of a light wave of frequency $\nu$ with a photon of energy $h\nu$. In 1917 Einstein created an extension to Bohrs model by the introduction of the three processes of stimulated emission, spontaneous emission and absorption (electromagnetic radiation).

== Modern treatments ==
The largest steps towards the modern treatment was the formulation of quantum mechanics with the matrix mechanics approach by Werner Heisenberg and the discovery of the Schrödinger equation by Erwin Schrödinger.

There are a variety of semi-classical treatments within AMO. Which aspects of the problem are treated quantum mechanically and which are treated classically is dependent on the specific problem at hand. The semi-classical approach is ubiquitous in computational work within AMO, largely due to the large decrease in computational cost and complexity associated with it.

For matter under the action of a laser, a fully quantum mechanical treatment of the atomic or molecular system is combined with the system being under the action of a classical electromagnetic field. Since the field is treated classically it can not deal with spontaneous emission. This semi-classical treatment is valid for most systems, particular those under the action of high intensity laser fields. The distinction between optical physics and quantum optics is the use of semi-classical and fully quantum treatments respectively.

Within collision dynamics and using the semi-classical treatment, the internal degrees of freedom may be treated quantum mechanically, whilst the relative motion of the quantum systems under consideration are treated classically. When considering medium to high speed collisions, the nuclei can be treated classically while the electron is treated quantum mechanically. In low speed collisions the approximation fails.

Classical Monte-Carlo methods for the dynamics of electrons can be described as semi-classical in that the initial conditions are calculated using a fully quantum treatment, but all further treatment is classical.

== Isolated atoms and molecules ==
Atomic, Molecular and Optical physics frequently considers atoms and molecules in isolation. Atomic models will consist of a single nucleus that may be surrounded by one or more bound electrons, whilst molecular models are typically concerned with molecular hydrogen and its molecular hydrogen ion. It is concerned with processes such as ionization, above threshold ionization and excitation by photons or collisions with atomic particles.

While modelling atoms in isolation may not seem realistic, if one considers molecules in a gas or plasma then the time-scales for molecule-molecule interactions are huge in comparison to the atomic and molecular processes that we are concerned with. This means that the individual molecules can be treated as if each were in isolation for the vast majority of the time. By this consideration atomic and molecular physics provides the underlying theory in plasma physics and atmospheric physics even though both deal with huge numbers of molecules.

== Electronic configuration ==
Electrons form notional shells around the nucleus. These are naturally in a ground state but can be excited by the absorption of energy from light (photons), magnetic fields, or interaction with a colliding particle (typically other electrons).

Electrons that populate a shell are said to be in a bound state. The energy necessary to remove an electron from its shell (taking it to infinity) is called the binding energy. Any quantity of energy absorbed by the electron in excess of this amount is converted to kinetic energy according to the conservation of energy. The atom is said to have undergone the process of ionization.

In the event that the electron absorbs a quantity of energy less than the binding energy, it may transition to an excited state or to a virtual state. After a statistically sufficient quantity of time, an electron in an excited state will undergo a transition to a lower state via spontaneous emission. The change in energy between the two energy levels must be accounted for (conservation of energy). In a neutral atom, the system will emit a photon of the difference in energy. However, if the lower state is in an inner shell, a phenomenon known as the Auger effect may take place where the energy is transferred to another bound electrons causing it to go into the continuum. This allows one to multiply ionize an atom with a single photon.

There are strict selection rules as to the electronic configurations that can be reached by excitation by light—however there are no such rules for excitation by collision processes.

== See also ==
- Born–Oppenheimer approximation
- Frequency doubling
- Diffraction
- Hyperfine structure
- Interferometry
- Isomeric shift
- Metamaterial cloaking
- Molecular energy state
- Molecular modeling
- Nanotechnology
- Negative index metamaterials
- Nonlinear optics
- Optical engineering
- Photon polarization
- Quantum chemistry
- Quantum optics
- Rigid rotor
- Spectroscopy
- Superlens
- Stationary state
- Transition of state
