= Rotational–vibrational spectroscopy =

Branch of molecular spectroscopy

Rotational–vibrational spectroscopy is a branch of molecular spectroscopy that is concerned with infrared and Raman spectra of molecules in the gas phase. Transitions involving changes in both vibrational and rotational states can be abbreviated as rovibrational (or ro-vibrational) transitions. When such transitions emit or absorb photons (electromagnetic radiation), the frequency is proportional to the difference in energy levels and can be detected by certain kinds of spectroscopy. Since changes in rotational energy levels are typically much smaller than changes in vibrational energy levels, changes in rotational state are said to give fine structure to the vibrational spectrum. For a given vibrational transition, the same theoretical treatment as for pure rotational spectroscopy gives the rotational quantum numbers, energy levels, and selection rules. In linear and spherical top molecules, rotational lines are found as simple progressions at both higher and lower frequencies relative to the pure vibration frequency. In symmetric top molecules the transitions are classified as parallel when the dipole moment change is parallel to the principal axis of rotation, and perpendicular when the change is perpendicular to that axis. The ro-vibrational spectrum of the asymmetric rotor water is important because of the presence of water vapor in the atmosphere.

== Overview ==
Ro-vibrational spectroscopy concerns molecules in the gas phase. There are sequences of quantized rotational levels associated with both the ground and excited vibrational states. The spectra are often resolved into lines due to transitions from one rotational level in the ground vibrational state to one rotational level in the vibrationally excited state. The lines corresponding to a given vibrational transition form a band.

In the simplest cases the part of the infrared spectrum involving vibrational transitions with the same rotational quantum number (ΔJ = 0) in ground and excited states is called the Q-branch. On the high frequency side of the Q-branch the energy of rotational transitions is added to the energy of the vibrational transition. This is known as the R-branch of the spectrum for ΔJ = +1. The P-branch for ΔJ = −1 lies on the low wavenumber side of the Q branch. The appearance of the R-branch is very similar to the appearance of the pure rotation spectrum (but shifted to much higher wavenumbers), and the P-branch appears as a nearly mirror image of the R-branch. (Note: Traditionally, infrared spectra are shown with the wavenumber scale decreasing from left to right, corresponding to increasing wavelength. More modern texts may show the wavenumber scale increasing from left to right. The P-branch is always at lower wavenumbers than the Q-branch.) The Q branch is sometimes missing because of transitions with no change in J being forbidden.

The appearance of rotational fine structure is determined by the symmetry of the molecular rotors which are classified, in the same way as for pure rotational spectroscopy, into linear molecules, spherical-, symmetric- and asymmetric- rotor classes. The quantum mechanical treatment of rotational fine structure is the same as for pure rotation.

The strength of an absorption line is related to the number of molecules with the initial values of the vibrational quantum number ν and the rotational quantum number $J$, and depends on temperature. Since there are actually $2J+1$ states with rotational quantum number $J$, the population with value $J$ increases with $J$ initially, and then decays at higher $J$. This gives the characteristic shape of the P and R branches.

A general convention is to label quantities that refer to the vibrational ground and excited states of a transition with double prime and single prime, respectively. For example, the rotational constant for the ground state is written as $B^{\prime\prime} ,$ and that of the excited state as $B^\prime .$ Also, these constants are expressed in the molecular spectroscopist's units of cm^{−1}. so that $B$ in this article corresponds to $\bar B = B/hc$ in the definition of rotational constant at Rigid rotor.

=== Method of combination differences ===
Numerical analysis of ro-vibrational spectral data would appear to be complicated by the fact that the wavenumber for each transition depends on two rotational constants, $B^{\prime\prime}$ and $B^\prime$. However combinations which depend on only one rotational constant are found by subtracting wavenumbers of pairs of lines (one in the P-branch and one in the R-branch) which have either the same lower level or the same upper level. For example, in a diatomic molecule the line denoted P(J + 1) is due to the transition (v = 0, J + 1) → (v = 1, J) (meaning a transition from the state with vibrational quantum number ν going from 0 to 1 and the rotational quantum number going from some value J + 1 to J, with J > 0), and the line R(J − 1) is due to the transition (v = 0, J − 1) → (v = 1, J). The difference between the two wavenumbers corresponds to the energy difference between the (J + 1) and (J − 1) levels of the lower vibrational state and is denoted by $\Delta_2$ since it is the difference between levels differing by two units of J. If centrifugal distortion is included, it is given by

$$\Delta_2^{\prime\prime}F(J) = \bar \nu (R(J-1)) - \bar \nu(P(J+1)) = (2B^{\prime\prime}-3D^{\prime\prime}) \left(2J+1\right)-D^{\prime\prime}\left(2J+1\right)^3$$

where $\bar \nu ()$ means the frequency (or wavenumber) of the given line. The main term, $2B''(2J+1),$ comes from the difference in the energy of the $J+1$ rotational state, $B''((J+1)(J+2)),$ and that of the $J-1$ state, $B''((J-1)J).$

The rotational constant of the ground vibrational state B′′ and centrifugal distortion constant, D′′ can be found by least-squares fitting this difference as a function of J. The constant B′′ is used to determine the internuclear distance in the ground state as in pure rotational spectroscopy. (See Appendix)

Similarly the difference R(J) − P(J) depends only on the constants B′ and D′ for the excited vibrational state (v = 1), and B′ can be used to determine the internuclear distance in that state (which is inaccessible to pure rotational spectroscopy).

$$\Delta_2^{\prime}F(J) = \bar \nu(R(J)) - \bar \nu(P(J)) = (2B^{\prime}-3D^{\prime}) \left(2J+1\right)-D^{\prime}\left(2J+1\right)^3$$

== Linear molecules ==
=== Heteronuclear diatomic molecules ===
Simulated vibration-rotation line spectrum of carbon monoxide, ^{12}C^{16}O. The P-branch is to the left of the gap near 2140 cm^{−1}, the R-branch on the right. (Note: Observed spectra of the fundamental band (shown here) and the first overtone band (for double excitation near 2 × 2140 cm^{−1}) can be seen in Banwell and McCash, p 67)

Schematic ro-vibrational energy level diagram for a linear molecule

Diatomic molecules with the general formula AB have one normal mode of vibration involving stretching of the A-B bond. The vibrational term values $G(v)$, (Note: Term value is directly related to energy by $E=hc G(v)$) for an anharmonic oscillator are given, to a first approximation, by

$$G(v) = \omega_e \left(v+{1 \over 2}\right) - \omega_e\chi_e \left(v+{1 \over 2}\right)^2\,$$

where v is a vibrational quantum number, ω_{e} is the harmonic wavenumber and χ_{e} is an anharmonicity constant.

When the molecule is in the gas phase, it can rotate about an axis, perpendicular to the molecular axis, passing through the centre of mass of the molecule. The rotational energy is also quantized, with term values to a first approximation given by

$$F_v(J) = B_v J \left( J+1 \right) - D J^2 \left( J+1 \right)^2$$

where J is a rotational quantum number and D is a centrifugal distortion constant. The rotational constant, B_{v} depends on the moment of inertia of the molecule, I_{v}, which varies with the vibrational quantum number, v

$$B_v = {h \over{8\pi^2cI_v}}; \quad I_v=\frac{m_A m_B}{m_A+m_B}d_v^2$$

where m_{A} and m_{B} are the masses of the atoms A and B, and d represents the distance between the atoms. The term values of the ro-vibrational states are found (in the Born–Oppenheimer approximation) by combining the expressions for vibration and rotation.

$$G(v)+F_v(J) = \left[ \omega_e \left(v+{1 \over 2}\right) + B_v J (J+1) \right]- \left[ \omega_e\chi_e \left(v+{1 \over 2}\right)^2 + D J^2 (J+1)^2 \right]$$

The first two terms in this expression correspond to a harmonic oscillator and a rigid rotor, the second pair of terms make a correction for anharmonicity and centrifugal distortion. A more general expression was given by Dunham.

The selection rule for electric dipole allowed ro-vibrational transitions, in the case of a diamagnetic diatomic molecule is

$\Delta v = \pm 1 \ (\pm 2, \pm 3, \textit{ etc.}$ (Note: Transitions with ∆v≠1 are called overtones. They are forbidden in the harmonic approximation but can be observed as weak bands because of anharmonicity.)$),\Delta J = \pm 1$

The transition with Δv=±1 is known as the fundamental transition. The selection rule has two consequences.

1. Both the vibrational and rotational quantum numbers must change. The transition :$\Delta v = \pm 1, \Delta J = 0$ (Q-branch) is forbidden
2. The energy change of rotation can be either subtracted from or added to the energy change of vibration, giving the P- and R- branches of the spectrum, respectively.

The calculation of the transition wavenumbers is more complicated than for pure rotation because the rotational constant B_{ν} is different in the ground and excited vibrational states. A simplified expression for the wavenumbers is obtained when the centrifugal distortion constants $D^\prime$ and $D^{\prime\prime}$ are approximately equal to each other.

$$\bar \nu = \omega_0 +(B ^\prime+B^{\prime\prime})m +(B^\prime-B^{\prime\prime})m^2-2(D^\prime+D^{\prime\prime})m^3,
\quad \omega_0=\omega_e(1-2\chi_e)\quad m=\pm 1, \pm 2 \ etc.$$

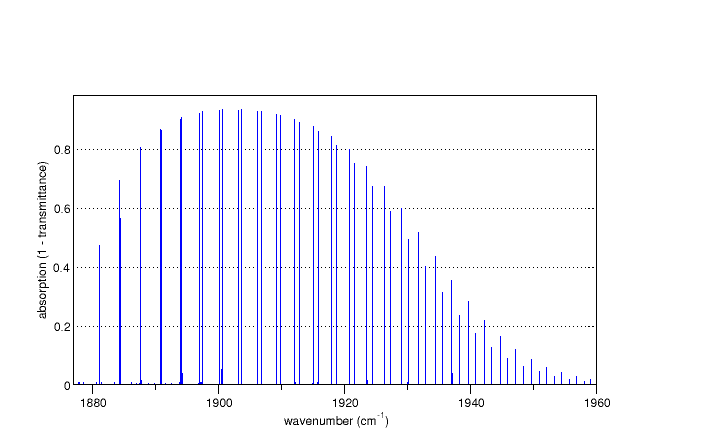
Spectrum of R-branch of nitric oxide, NO, simulated with Spectralcalc, showing λ-doubling caused by the presence of an unpaired electron in the molecule

where positive m values refer to the R-branch and negative values refer to the P-branch. The term ω_{0} gives the position of the (missing) Q-branch, the term $(B ^\prime+B^{\prime\prime})m$ implies an progression of equally spaced lines in the P- and R- branches, but the third term, $(B^\prime-B^{\prime\prime})m^2$shows that the separation between adjacent lines changes with changing rotational quantum number. When $B^{\prime\prime}$ is greater than $B^\prime$, as is usually the case, as J increases the separation between lines decreases in the R-branch and increases in the P-branch. Analysis of data from the infrared spectrum of carbon monoxide, gives value of $B^{\prime\prime}$ of 1.915 cm^{−1} and $B^{\prime}$ of 1.898 cm^{−1}. The bond lengths are easily obtained from these constants as r_{0} = 113.3 pm, r_{1} = 113.6 pm. These bond lengths are slightly different from the equilibrium bond length. This is because there is zero-point energy in the vibrational ground state, whereas the equilibrium bond length is at the minimum in the potential energy curve. The relation between the rotational constants is given by

$$B_v=B_{eq}-\alpha \left(v+{1\over 2}\right)$$

where ν is a vibrational quantum number and α is a vibration-rotation interaction constant which can be calculated when the B values for two different vibrational states can be found. For carbon monoxide r_{eq} = 113.0 pm.

Nitric oxide, NO, is a special case as the molecule is paramagnetic, with one unpaired electron. Coupling of the electron spin angular momentum with the molecular vibration causes lambda-doubling (Note: Another example of lambda-doubling is found in the energy levels of the hydroxyl radical.) with calculated harmonic frequencies of 1904.03 and 1903.68 cm^{−1}. Rotational levels are also split.

=== Homonuclear diatomic molecules ===
The quantum mechanics for homonuclear diatomic molecules such as dinitrogen, N_{2}, and fluorine, F_{2}, is qualitatively the same as for heteronuclear diatomic molecules, but the selection rules governing transitions are different. Since the electric dipole moment of the homonuclear diatomics is zero, the fundamental vibrational transition is electric-dipole-forbidden and the molecules are infrared inactive. However, a weak quadrupole-allowed spectrum of N_{2} can be observed when using long path-lengths both in the laboratory and in the atmosphere. The spectra of these molecules can be observed by Raman spectroscopy because the molecular vibration is Raman-allowed.

Dioxygen is a special case as the molecule is paramagnetic so magnetic-dipole-allowed transitions can be observed in the infrared. The unit electron spin has three spatial orientations with respect to the molecular rotational angular momentum vector, N, (Note: Some texts use the symbol K for this quantum number) so that each rotational level is split into three states with total angular momentum (molecular rotation plus electron spin) $\mathrm {J\hbar} \,$, J = N + 1, N, and N - 1, each J state of this so-called p-type triplet arising from a different orientation of the spin with respect to the rotational motion of the molecule. Selection rules for magnetic dipole transitions allow transitions between successive members of the triplet (ΔJ = ±1) so that for each value of the rotational angular momentum quantum number N there are two allowed transitions. The ^{16}O nucleus has zero nuclear spins angular momentum, so that symmetry considerations demand that N may only have odd values.

=== Raman spectra of diatomic molecules ===
The selection rule is

$$\Delta J = 0, \pm 2$$

so that the spectrum has an O-branch (∆J = −2), a Q-branch (∆J = 0) and an S-branch (∆J=+2). In the approximation that B′′ = B′ = B the wavenumbers are given by

$$\bar \nu (S(J))= \omega_0 +4BJ+6B = \omega_0 + 6B, \quad\omega_0 + 10B, \quad\omega_0 + 14B, \quad ...$$
$$\bar \nu (O(J))= \omega_0 -4BJ+2B = \omega_0 - 6B, \quad\omega_0 - 10B, \quad\omega_0 - 14B, \quad ...$$

since the S-branch starts at J=0 and the O-branch at J=2. So, to a first approximation, the separation between S(0) and O(2) is 12B and the separation between adjacent lines in both O- and S- branches is 4B. The most obvious effect of the fact that B′′ ≠ B′ is that the Q-branch has a series of closely spaced side lines on the low-frequency side due to transitions in which ΔJ=0 for J=1,2 etc. Useful difference formulae, neglecting centrifugal distortion are as follows.

$$\Delta_4^{\prime\prime}F(J) = \bar \nu [S(J-2)] - \bar \nu [O(J+2) ] = 4B^{\prime\prime}(2J+1)$$
$$\Delta_4^{\prime}F(J) = \bar \nu [S(J)] - \bar \nu [O(J)] = 4B^{\prime}(2J+1)$$

Molecular oxygen is a special case as the molecule is paramagnetic, with two unpaired electrons.

For homonuclear diatomics, nuclear spin statistical weights lead to alternating line intensities between even-$J^{\prime\prime}$ and odd-$J^{\prime\prime}$ levels. For nuclear spin I = 1/2 as in ^{1}H_{2} and ^{19}F_{2} the intensity alternation is 1:3. For ^{2}H_{2} and ^{14}N_{2}, I=1 and the statistical weights are 6 and 3 so that the even-$J^{\prime\prime}$ levels are twice as intense. For ^{16}O_{2} (I=0) all transitions with even values of $J^{\prime\prime}$ are forbidden.

=== Polyatomic linear molecules ===
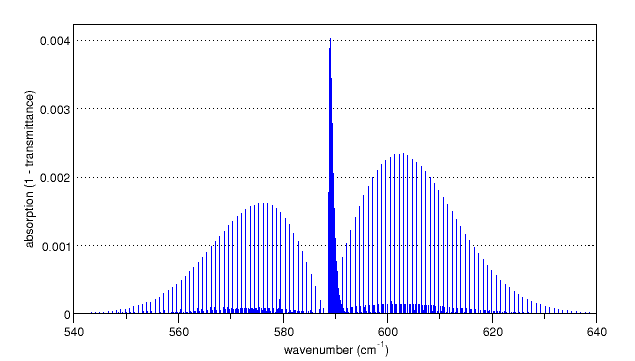
Spectrum of bending mode in ^{14}N^{14}N^{16}O simulated with Spectralcalc. The weak superimposed spectrum is due to species containing ^{15}N at natural abundance of 0.3%

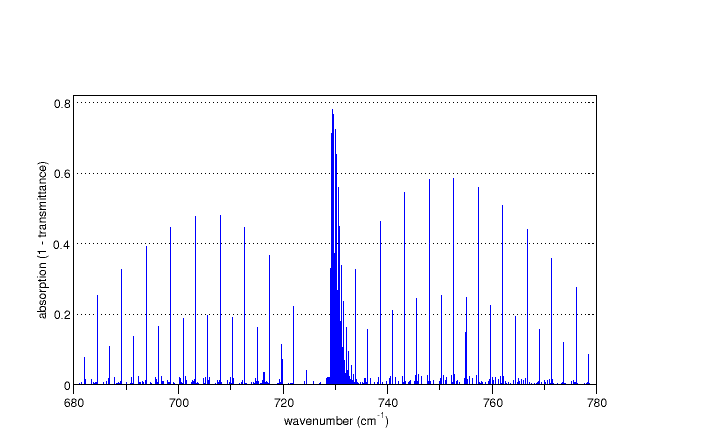
Spectrum of a perpendicular band from acetylene, C_{2}H_{2}, simulated with Spectralcalc showing 1,3 intensity alternation in both P- and R- branches. See also Hollas p157

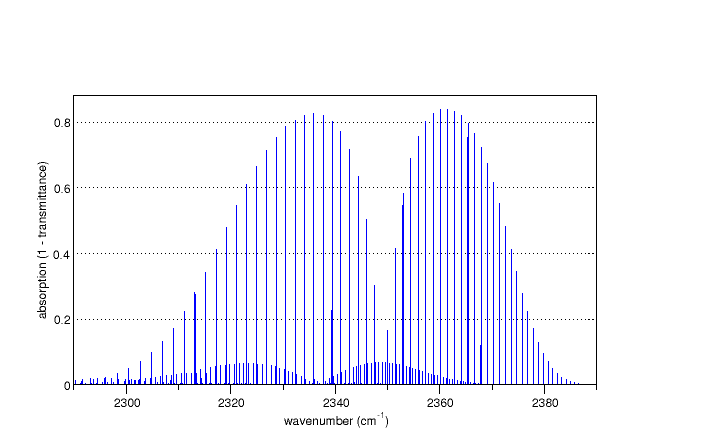
Spectrum of the asymmetric stretching (parallel) band of carbon dioxide, ^{12}C^{16}O_{2} simulated with Spectralcalc. The weak superimposed spectrum is due to absorption of the first vibrationally excited level (0 1^{1} 0), which due to its low energy is populated at room temperature

These molecules fall into two classes, according to symmetry: centrosymmetric molecules with point group D_{∞h}, such as carbon dioxide, CO_{2}, and ethyne or acetylene, HCCH; and non-centrosymmetric molecules with point group C_{∞v} such as hydrogen cyanide, HCN, and nitrous oxide, NNO. Centrosymmetric linear molecules have a dipole moment of zero, so do not show a pure rotation spectrum in the infrared or microwave regions. On the other hand, in certain vibrational excited states the molecules do have a dipole moment so that a ro-vibrational spectrum can be observed in the infrared.

The spectra of these molecules are classified according to the direction of the dipole moment change vector. When the vibration induces a dipole moment change pointing along the molecular axis the term parallel is applied, with the symbol $\parallel$. When the vibration induces a dipole moment pointing perpendicular to the molecular axis the term perpendicular is applied, with the symbol $\perp$. In both cases the P- and R- branch wavenumbers follow the same trend as in diatomic molecules. The two classes differ in the selection rules that apply to ro-vibrational transitions. For parallel transitions the selection rule is the same as for diatomic molecules, namely, the transition corresponding to the Q-branch is forbidden. An example is the C-H stretching mode of hydrogen cyanide.

For a perpendicular vibration the transition ΔJ=0 is allowed. This means that the transition is allowed for the molecule with the same rotational quantum number in the ground and excited vibrational state, for all the populated rotational states. This makes for an intense, relatively broad, Q-branch consisting of overlapping lines due to each rotational state. The N-N-O bending mode of nitrous oxide, at ca. 590 cm^{−1} is an example.

The spectra of centrosymmetric molecules exhibit alternating line intensities due to quantum state symmetry effects, since rotation of the molecule by 180° about a 2-fold rotation axis is equivalent to exchanging identical nuclei. In carbon dioxide, the oxygen atoms of the predominant isotopic species ^{12}C^{16}O_{2} have spin zero and are bosons, so that the total wavefunction must be symmetric when the two ^{16}O nuclei are exchanged. The nuclear spin factor is always symmetric for two spin-zero nuclei, so that the rotational factor must also be symmetric which is true only for even-J levels. The odd-J rotational levels cannot exist and the allowed vibrational bands consist of only absorption lines from even-J initial levels. The separation between adjacent lines in the P- and R- branches is close to 4B rather than 2B as alternate lines are missing. For acetylene the hydrogens of ^{1}H^{12}C^{12}C^{1}H have spin-1/2 and are fermions, so the total wavefunction is antisymmetric when two ^{1}H nuclei are exchanged. As is true for ortho and para hydrogen the nuclear spin function of the two hydrogens has three symmetric ortho states and one antisymmetric para states. For the three ortho states, the rotational wave function must be antisymmetric corresponding to odd J, and for the one para state it is symmetric corresponding to even J. The population of the odd J levels are therefore three times higher than the even J levels, and alternate line intensities are in the ratio 3:1.

== Spherical top molecules ==
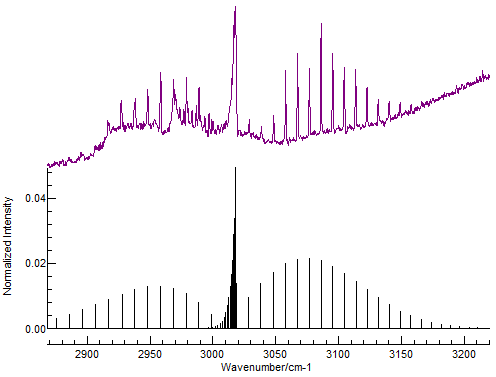
Upper: low-resolution infrared spectrum of asymmetric stretching band of methane (CH_{4}); lower: PGOPHER simulated line spectrum, ignoring Coriolis coupling

These molecules have equal moments of inertia about any axis, and belong to the point groups T_{d} (tetrahedral AX_{4}) and O_{h} (octahedral AX_{6}). Molecules with these symmetries have a dipole moment of zero, so do not have a pure rotation spectrum in the infrared or microwave regions.

Tetrahedral molecules such as methane, CH_{4}, have infrared-active stretching and bending vibrations, belonging to the T_{2} (sometimes written as F_{2}) representation. (Note: The term representation is used in group theory to classify the effect of symmetry operations on, in this case, a molecular vibration. The symbols for the representations are to be found in the first column of the character table that applies to the particular molecular symmetry.) These vibrations are triply degenerate and the rotational energy levels have three components separated by the Coriolis interaction. The rotational term values are given, to a first order approximation, by

$$F^+=B_\nu J(J+1) +2B_\nu\zeta_r (J+1)$$
$$F^0=B_\nu J(J+1)$$
$$F^-=B_\nu J(J+1) -2B_\nu\zeta_r J$$

where $\zeta_r$ is a constant for Coriolis coupling. The selection rule for a fundamental vibration is

$$\Delta J = 0, \pm 1$$

Thus, the spectrum is very much like the spectrum from a perpendicular vibration of a linear molecule, with a strong Q-branch composed of many transitions in which the rotational quantum number is the same in the vibrational ground and excited states, $J^\prime =J^{\prime\prime} = 1, 2 ...$ The effect of Coriolis coupling is clearly visible in the C-H stretching vibration of methane, though detailed study has shown that the first-order formula for Coriolis coupling, given above, is not adequate for methane.

== Symmetric top molecules ==
These molecules have a unique principal rotation axis of order 3 or higher. There are two distinct moments of inertia and therefore two rotational constants. For rotation about any axis perpendicular to the unique axis, the moment of inertia is $I_{\perp}$ and the rotational constant is $B = {h \over{8\pi^2cI_{\perp}}}$, as for linear molecules. For rotation about the unique axis, however, the moment of inertia is $I_{\parallel}$ and the rotational constant is $A = {h \over{8\pi^2cI_{\parallel}}}$. Examples include ammonia, NH_{3} and methyl chloride, CH_{3}Cl (both of molecular symmetry described by point group C_{3v}), boron trifluoride, BF_{3} and phosphorus pentachloride, PCl_{5} (both of point group D_{3h}), and benzene, C_{6}H_{6} (point group D_{6h}).

For symmetric rotors a quantum number J is associated with the total angular momentum of the molecule. For a given value of J, there is a 2J+1- fold degeneracy with the quantum number, M taking the values +J ...0 ... -J. The third quantum number, K is associated with rotation about the principal rotation axis of the molecule. As with linear molecules, transitions are classified as parallel, $\parallel$ or perpendicular,$\perp$, in this case according to the direction of the dipole moment change with respect to the principal rotation axis. A third category involves certain overtones and combination bands which share the properties of both parallel and perpendicular transitions. The selection rules are

$\parallel$ If K ≠ 0, then ΔJ = 0, ±1 and ΔK = 0

If K = 0, then ΔJ = ±1 and ΔK = 0

$\perp$ ΔJ = 0, ±1 and ΔK = ±1

The fact that the selection rules are different is the justification for the classification and it means that the spectra have a different appearance which can often be immediately recognized. An expression for the calculated wavenumbers of the P- and R- branches may be given as

$\bar \nu = \bar \nu_0 +(B^\prime+B^{\prime\prime})m+(B^\prime-B^{\prime\prime} -D_J^\prime+D_J^{\prime\prime})m^2$

$$-2(D_J^\prime+D_J^{\prime\prime})m^3-(D_J^\prime-D_J^{\prime\prime})m^4$$
$$+\left\{
\left[ (A^\prime-B^\prime)- (A^{\prime\prime}-B^{\prime\prime}) \right]-\left[ D_{JK}^\prime+D_{JK}^{\prime\prime} \right]m
-\left[ D_{JK}^\prime - D_{JK}^{\prime\prime} \right] m^2
\right \} K^2 -(D_K^\prime - D_K^{\prime \prime} ) K^4$$

in which m = J+1 for the R-branch and -J for the P-branch. The three centrifugal distortion constants $D_J, D_{JK}$, and $D_K$ are needed to fit the term values of each level. The wavenumbers of the sub-structure corresponding to each band are given by

$$\bar \nu = \bar\nu_{sub} + (B^\prime-B^{\prime\prime})J(J+1) - (D_J^\prime -D_J^{\prime\prime})J^2(J+1)^2 -(D_{JK}^\prime -D_{JK}^{\prime\prime})J(J+1)K^2$$

$\bar \nu_{sub}$ represents the Q-branch of the sub-structure, whose position is given by

$$\bar\nu_{sub}= \bar\nu_0+ \left[ (A^\prime - B^\prime) - (A^{\prime\prime}-B^{\prime\prime}) \right]K^2 -(D_K^\prime-D_K^{\prime\prime})K^4$$.

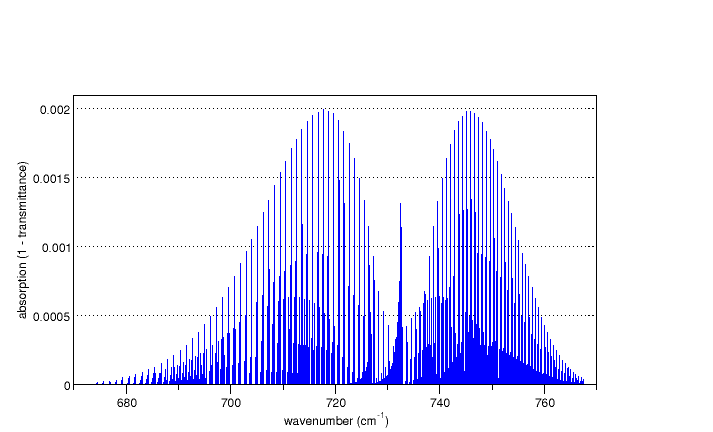
Spectrum of the C-Cl stretching band in CH_{3}Cl (parallel band) simulated with Spectralcalc.

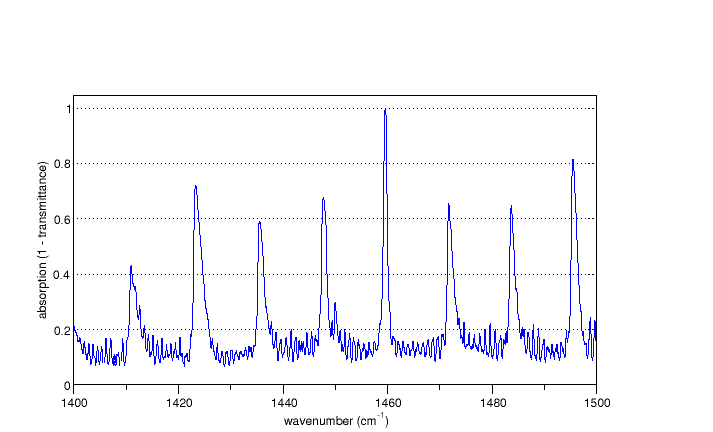
Part of the spectrum of the asymmetric H-C-H bending vibration in CH_{3}Cl (perpendicular band), simulated with Spectralcalc

=== Parallel bands ===
The C-Cl stretching vibration of methyl chloride, CH_{3}Cl, gives a parallel band since the dipole moment change is aligned with the 3-fold rotation axis. The line spectrum shows the sub-structure of this band rather clearly; in reality, very high resolution spectroscopy would be needed to resolve the fine structure fully. Allen and Cross show parts of the spectrum of CH_{3}D and give a detailed description of the numerical analysis of the experimental data.

=== Perpendicular bands ===
The selection rule for perpendicular bands give rise to more transitions than with parallel bands. A band can be viewed as a series of sub-structures, each with P, Q and R branches. The Q-branches are separated by approximately 2(A′-B′). The asymmetric HCH bending vibration of methyl chloride is typical. It shows a series of intense Q-branches with weak rotational fine structure. Analysis of the spectra is made more complicated by the fact that the ground-state vibration is bound, by symmetry, to be a degenerate vibration, which means that Coriolis coupling also affects the spectrum.

=== Hybrid bands ===
Overtones of a degenerate fundamental vibration have components of more than one symmetry type. For example, the first overtone of a vibration belonging to the E representation in a molecule like ammonia, NH_{3}, will have components belonging to A_{1} and E representations. A transition to the A_{1} component will give a parallel band and a transition to the E component will give perpendicular bands; the result is a hybrid band.

=== Inversion in ammonia ===
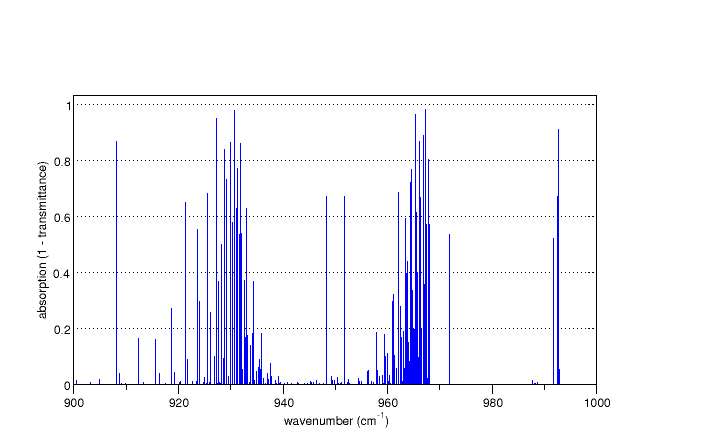
Spectrum of central region of the symmetric bending vibration in ammonia simulated with Spectralcalc, illustrating inversion doubling.

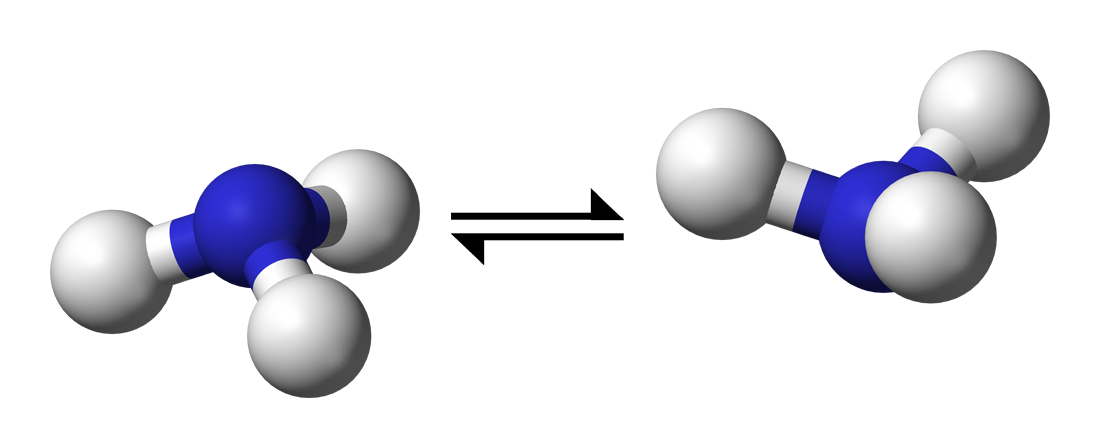
Nitrogen inversion in ammonia

For ammonia, NH_{3}, the symmetric bending vibration is observed as two branches near 930 cm^{−1} and 965 cm^{−1}. This so-called inversion doubling arises because the symmetric bending vibration is actually a large-amplitude motion known as inversion, in which the nitrogen atom passes through the plane of the three hydrogen atoms, similar to the inversion of an umbrella. The potential energy curve for such a vibration has a double minimum for the two pyramidal geometries, so that the vibrational energy levels occur in pairs which correspond to combinations of the vibrational states in the two potential minima. The two v = 1 states combine to form a symmetric state (1^{+}) at 932.5 cm^{−1} above the ground (0^{+}) state and an antisymmetric state (1^{−}) at 968.3 cm^{−1}.

The vibrational ground state (v = 0) is also doubled although the energy difference is much smaller, and the transition between the two levels can be measured directly in the microwave region, at ca. 24 GHz (0.8 cm^{−1}). This transition is historically significant and was used in the ammonia maser, the fore-runner of the laser.

== Asymmetric top molecules ==
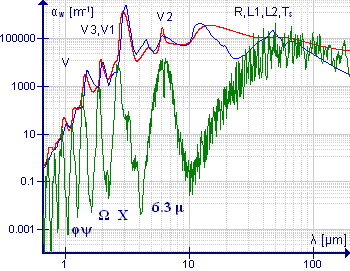
Absorption spectrum (attenuation coefficient vs. wavelength) of liquid water (red) atmospheric water vapor (green) and ice (blue line) between 667 nm and 200 μm. The plot for vapor is a transformation of data Synthetic spectrum for gas mixture "Pure H_{2}O" (296K, 1 atm) retrieved from Hitran on the Web Information System.

Asymmetric top molecules have at most one 2-fold rotation axis. There are three unequal moments of inertia about three mutually perpendicular principal axes. The spectra are very complex. The transition wavenumbers cannot be expressed in terms of an analytical formula but can be calculated using numerical methods.

The water molecule is an important example of this class of molecule, particularly because of the presence of water vapor in the atmosphere. The low-resolution spectrum shown in green illustrates the complexity of the spectrum. At wavelengths greater than 10 μm (or wavenumbers less than 1000 cm^{−1}) the absorption is due to pure rotation. The band around 6.3 μm (1590 cm^{−1}) is due to the HOH bending vibration; the considerable breadth of this band is due to the presence of extensive rotational fine structure. High-resolution spectra of this band are shown in Allen and Cross, p 221. The symmetric and asymmetric stretching vibrations are close to each other, so the rotational fine structures of these bands overlap. The bands at shorter wavelength are overtones and combination bands, all of which show rotational fine structure. Medium resolution spectra of the bands around 1600 cm^{−1} and 3700 cm^{−1} are shown in Banwell and McCash, p91.

Ro-vibrational bands of asymmetric top molecules are classed as A-, B- or C- type for transitions in which the dipole moment change is along the axis of smallest moment of inertia to the highest.

== Experimental methods ==
Ro-vibrational spectra are usually measured at high spectral resolution. In the past, this was achieved by using an echelle grating as the spectral dispersion element in a grating spectrometer. This is a type of diffraction grating optimized to use higher diffraction orders. Today at all resolutions the preferred method is FTIR. The primary reason for this is that infrared detectors are inherently noisy, and FTIR detects summed signals at multiple wavelengths simultaneously achieving a higher signal to noise by virtue of Fellgett's advantage for multiplexed methods. The resolving power of an FTIR spectrometer depends on the maximum retardation of the moving mirror. For example, to achieve a resolution of 0.1 cm^{−1}, the moving mirror must have a maximum displacement of 10 cm from its position at zero path difference. Connes measured the vibration-rotation spectrum of Venusian CO_{2} at this resolution. A spectrometer with 0.001 cm^{−1} resolution is now available commercially. The throughput advantage of FTIR is important for high-resolution spectroscopy as the monochromator in a dispersive instrument with the same resolution would have very narrow entrance and exit slits.

When measuring the spectra of gases it is relatively easy to obtain very long path-lengths by using a multiple reflection cell. This is important because it allows the pressure to be reduced so as to minimize pressure broadening of the spectral lines, which may degrade resolution. Path lengths up to 20m are commercially available.

== Appendix ==
The method of combination differences uses differences of wavenumbers in the P- and R- branches to obtain data that depend only on rotational constants in the vibrational ground or excited state. For the excited state

$$\Delta_2^{\prime}F(J)^{observed} = \bar \nu [R(J) ] - \bar \nu [P(J) ]$$

This function can be fitted, using the method of least-squares to data for carbon monoxide, from Harris and Bertolucci. The data calculated with the formula

$$\Delta_2^{\prime}F(J)^{calculated} = 2B^{\prime\prime} \left(2J+1\right)$$

in which centrifugal distortion is ignored, are shown in the columns labelled with (1). This formula implies that the data should lie on a straight line with slope 2B′′ and intercept zero. At first sight the data appear to conform to this model, with a root mean square residual of 0.21 cm^{−1}. However, when centrifugal distortion is included, using the formula

$$\Delta_2^{\prime}F(J)^{calculated} = (2B^{\prime\prime}-3D^{\prime\prime}) \left(2J+1\right)-D^{\prime\prime}\left(2J+1\right)^3$$

the least-squares fit is improved markedly, with ms residual decreasing to 0.000086 cm^{−1}. The calculated data are shown in the columns labelled with (2).

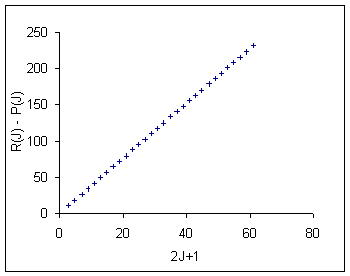
Plot of the differences R(J)-P(J) as a function of 2J+1 taken from observed data for the fundamental vibration of carbon monoxide

Wavenumbers /cm^{−1} for the fundamental ro-vibrational band of carbon monoxide
J	2J+1	$\Delta_2^{\prime}F(J)$	Calculated (1)	Residual (1)	Calculated (2)	Residual (2)
1	3	11.4298	11.3877	0.0421	11.4298	−0.000040
2	5	19.0493	18.9795	0.0698	19.0492	0.000055
3	7	26.6680	26.5713	0.0967	26.6679	0.000083
4	9	34.2856	34.1631	0.1225	34.2856	0.000037
5	11	41.9020	41.7549	0.1471	41.9019	0.000111
6	13	49.5167	49.3467	0.1700	49.5166	0.000097
7	15	57.1295	56.9385	0.1910	57.1294	0.000089
8	17	64.7401	64.5303	0.2098	64.7400	0.000081
9	19	72.3482	72.1221	0.2261	72.3481	0.000064
10	21	79.9536	79.7139	0.2397	79.9535	0.000133
11	23	87.5558	87.3057	0.2501	87.5557	0.000080
12	25	95.1547	94.8975	0.2572	95.1546	0.000100
13	27	102.7498	102.4893	0.2605	102.7498	−0.000016
14	29	110.3411	110.0811	0.2600	110.3411	0.000026
15	31	117.9280	117.6729	0.2551	117.9281	−0.000080
16	33	125.5105	125.2647	0.2458	125.5105	−0.000041
17	35	133.0882	132.8565	0.2317	133.0882	0.000035
18	37	140.6607	140.4483	0.2124	140.6607	0.000043
19	39	148.2277	148.0401	0.1876	148.2277	−0.000026
20	41	155.7890	155.6319	0.1571	155.7891	−0.000077
21	43	163.3443	163.2237	0.1206	163.3444	−0.000117
22	45	170.8934	170.8155	0.0779	170.8935	−0.000053
23	47	178.4358	178.4073	0.0285	178.4359	−0.000093
24	49	185.9713	185.9991	−0.0278	185.9714	−0.000142
25	51	193.4997	193.5909	−0.0912	193.4998	−0.000107
26	53	201.0206	201.1827	−0.1621	201.0207	−0.000097
27	55	208.5338	208.7745	−0.2407	208.5338	−0.000016
28	57	216.0389	216.3663	−0.3274	216.0389	0.000028
20	59	223.5357	223.9581	−0.4224	223.5356	0.000128
30	61	231.0238	231.5499	−0.5261	231.0236	0.000178

== Bibliography ==
- Allen, H.C.; Cross, P.C. (1963). Molecular vib-rotors; the theory and interpretation of high resolution infra-red spectra. New York: Wiley.
- Atkins, P.W.; de Paula, J. (2006). Physical Chemistry (8th ed.). Oxford University Press. pp. 431–469. ISBN 0198700725. Chapter (Molecular Spectroscopy), Section (Vibration-rotation spectra) and page numbers may be different in different editions.
- Banwell, Colin N.; McCash, Elaine M. (1994). Fundamentals of molecular spectroscopy (4th ed.). McGraw-Hill. p. 40. ISBN 0-07-707976-0.
- Hollas, M.J. (1996). Modern Spectroscopy (3rd ed.). Wiley. ISBN 0471965227.
- Straughan, B.P.; Walker, S. (1976). Spectroscopy. Vol. 2 (3rd ed.). Chapman and Hall. pp. 176–204. ISBN 0-470-15032-7.
