= Dunham expansion =

In quantum chemistry, the Dunham expansion is an expression for the rotational-vibrational energy levels of a diatomic molecule:

$$E(v,J,\Omega) = \sum_{k,l} Y_{k,l} (v+1/2)^k [J(J+1) - \Omega^2]^l,$$

where $v$ and $J$ are the vibrational and rotational quantum numbers, and $\Omega$ is the projection of $J$ along the internuclear axis in the body-fixed frame. The constant coefficients $Y_{k,l}$ are called Dunham parameters with $Y_{0,0}$ representing the electronic energy. The expression derives from a semiclassical treatment of a perturbational approach to deriving the energy levels. The Dunham parameters are typically calculated by a least-squares fitting procedure of energy levels with the quantum numbers.

== Relation to conventional band spectrum constants ==
	$Y_{0,1} = B_e$	$Y_{0,2} = -D_e$	$Y_{0,3} = H_e$	$Y_{0,4} = L_e$
$Y_{1,0} = \omega_e$	$Y_{1,1} = -\alpha_e$	$Y_{1,2} = -\beta_e$		
$Y_{2,0} = -\omega_ex_e$	$Y_{2,1} = \gamma_e$			
$Y_{3,0} = \omega_ey_e$
$Y_{4,0} = \omega_ez_e$

This table adapts the sign conventions from the book of Huber and Herzberg.

== See also ==
- Rotational-vibrational spectroscopy
