= Edgar Bright Wilson =

American chemist (1908–1992)

- Born: December 18, 1908; Gallatin, Tennessee, United States
- Died: July 12, 1992 (aged 83); Cambridge, Massachusetts
- Children: Kenneth Wilson
- Awards: ACS Award in Pure Chemistry (1937); Peter Debye Award (1962); National Medal of Science (1975); Welch Award in Chemistry (1978); Earle K. Plyler Prize for Molecular Spectroscopy (1978); Willard Gibbs Award (1979); Elliott Cresson Medal (1982)
- Scientific career
- Fields: Chemistry
- Workplaces: Harvard University
- Doctoral advisor: Linus Pauling
- Doctoral students: J. C. Decius; Dudley Herschbach; Robert Karplus; Ira N. Levine; William H Miller; Frank A. Weinhold

Edgar Bright Wilson Jr. (December 18, 1908 – July 12, 1992) was an American chemist.

Wilson was a prominent and accomplished chemist and teacher, recipient of the National Medal of Science in 1975, Guggenheim Fellowships in 1949 and 1970, the Elliott Cresson Medal in 1982, and a number of honorary doctorates. He was a member of both the American Academy of Arts and Sciences, the American Philosophical Society, and the United States National Academy of Sciences. He was also the Theodore William Richards Professor of Chemistry, Emeritus at Harvard University. One of his sons, Kenneth G. Wilson, was awarded the Nobel Prize in physics in 1982. E. B. Wilson was a student and protégé of Nobel laureate Linus Pauling and was a coauthor with Pauling of Introduction to Quantum Mechanics, a graduate level textbook in Quantum Mechanics. Wilson was also the thesis advisor of Nobel laureate Dudley Herschbach. Wilson was elected to the first class of the Harvard Society of Fellows.

Wilson made major contributions to the field of molecular spectroscopy. He developed the first rigorous quantum mechanical Hamiltonian in internal coordinates for a polyatomic molecule. He developed the theory of how rotational spectra are influenced by centrifugal distortion during rotation. He pioneered the use of group theory for the analysis and simplification normal mode analysis, particularly for high symmetry molecules, such as benzene. In 1955, Wilson published Molecular Vibrations along with J.C. Decius and Paul C. Cross. Following the Second World War, Wilson was a pioneer in the application of microwave spectroscopy to the determination of molecular structure. Wilson wrote an influential introductory text Introduction to Scientific Research that provided an introduction of all the steps of scientific research, from defining a problem through the archival of data after publication.

Starting in 1997, the American Chemical Society has annually awarded the E. Bright Wilson Award in Spectroscopy, named in honor of Wilson.

== Scientific career ==
Bright started his higher education at Princeton in 1926, where he received both his bachelor's and master's degree in 1930 and 1931 respectively. He then went to the California Institute of Technology where he worked with Linus Pauling on crystal structure determinations and finished his PhD. During this time, he also wrote a textbook with Pauling, called Introduction to Quantum Mechanics, which was published in 1935. This textbook was still in print in the year 2000, some 70 years after its initial publication.

In 1934, Bright was elected to the Society of Fellows at Harvard for his work done at the California Institute of Technology. His election meant he had a 3-year junior fellowship at Harvard during which he studied molecular motion and symmetry analysis. In 1936 the Harvard Chemistry department appointed Bright as an assistant professor during his third year of his fellowship. He taught courses in chemistry and quantum mechanics and was promoted to an associate professor with tenure after three years. From 1934 to 1941, Bright, along with Harold Gershinowitz, constructed an automatic infrared spectrometer which was used to measure vibrational absorption spectra of various molecules.

After the start of World War II Bright started research on explosives with the National Defense Research Committee (NDRC) where he studied shock waves in water. In 1942 an Underwater Explosives Research Laboratory (UERL) was opened at the Woods Hole Oceanographic Institution which Bright led. The US navy, exasperated by the continual harassment of Nazi U-boats on allied shipping vessels had a strong interest in the UERL and its research with depth charges and other anti-submarine weapons. To facilitate this research, the laboratory acquired an old fishing vessel, the Reliance, which was fitted to record electronic signals from pressure sensors deep underwater.

After the end of the war Bright returned to Harvard. In 1947 Bright and Richard Hughes invented and built a Stark-effect microwave spectrometer which could measure different radio waves and became an important tool in spectroscopy. From 1949 to 1950, Bright took a sabbatical in Oxford during which he mainly worked on his book Introduction to Scientific Research which was published in 1952.

In 1952–1953, during the Korean War, Bright became the Research director and deputy director of the Weapons Evaluation Group (WSEG), where he only stayed for 18 months. He later began accepting assignments in the mid-1960s in Washington during the Vietnam war.

In 1955, with co-authors J. C. Decius and P.C. Cross, Bright published a book Molecular Vibrations, which discussed infrared and Raman spectra of polyatomic molecules. In 1955 Bright studied the internal rotation of single bonds in molecules using microwave spectroscopy. In 1965 Bright studied the rotational energy transfer in inelastic molecular collisions. In 1970, Bright began to study hydrogen bonding and the structure of hydrogen bonds using low resolution microwave spectroscopy.

In 1979, Bright retired and was named an emeritus professor. The E. Bright Wilson Award in Spectroscopy was established in 1994 by the American Chemical Society.

== Personal life ==
Wilson was born in Gallatin, Tennessee to mother Alma Lackey and father Edgar Bright Wilson, a lawyer. His family soon moved to Yonkers, New York.

He was married to Emily Buckingham from 1935 until she died in 1954. He remarried to Therese Bremer in 1955, a distinguished photochemist. Wilson had a total of 4 sons and 2 daughters, one of whom was Kenneth Wilson, a Nobel Laureate in physics.

In his final years, Wilson suffered from Parkinson's disease. He died on July 12, 1992, in Cambridge, Massachusetts of pneumonia.
