= Ira N. Levine =

American author, scientist

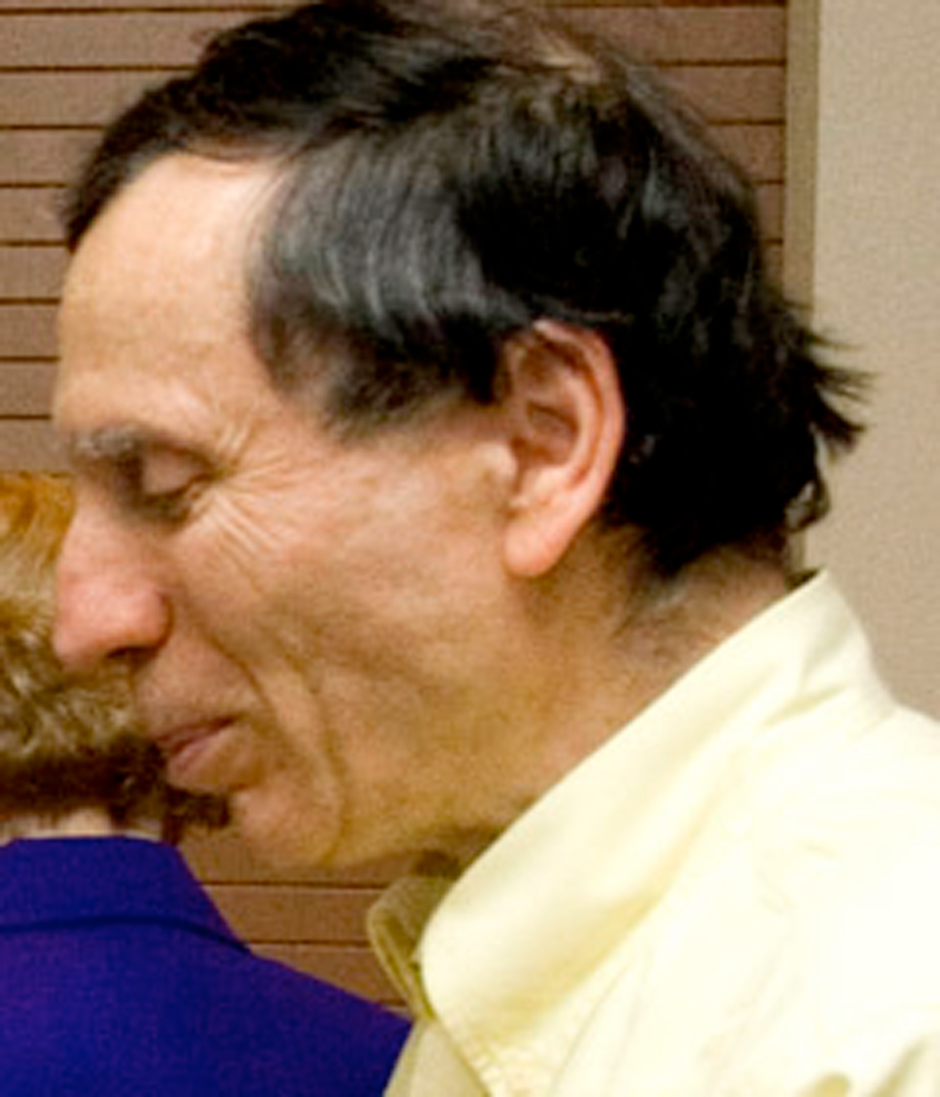
- Born: Ira Noel Levine; February 12, 1937; Brooklyn, NY
- Died: December 17, 2015 (aged 78)
- Education: Carnegie Mellon College of Engineering (BA. 1958) Harvard University (MA. 1959, PhD. 1963)
- Scientific career
- Fields: microwave spectroscopy, quantum chemistry, physical chemistry
- Workplaces: Brooklyn College
- Thesis: The Microwave Spectrum and Structure of Formaldoxime (1963)
- Doctoral advisor: Edgar Bright Wilson, Jr.

Ira N. Levine (February 12, 1937 – December 17, 2015) was an American author, scientist, professor and faculty member in the chemistry department at Brooklyn College. He is widely acknowledged for his research in the field of microwave spectroscopy, and for several widely known textbooks in physical chemistry and quantum chemistry.

== Biography ==
Levine was born in Brooklyn, New York. He was graduated from Erasmus Hall High School. In 1952, Levine was graduated with an honorary degree in chemistry and named as top scholastic honorary graduate in the College of Engineering and Science at Carnegie Mellon College of Engineering. In 1959, he went on to graduate school in the field of physical chemistry and mathematical physics at Harvard University. In 1963, he was awarded a PhD in chemistry under the guidance of Professor E. Bright Wilson by Harvard University. He started his academic career at Brooklyn College in 1964 where he taught first-year courses in general chemistry as well as advanced courses in physical and quantum chemistry. He became a full-time professor in 1978. Levine is recognized for several textbooks he authored and for his research in physical chemistry, quantum chemistry and microwave spectroscopy. Levine textbooks include Quantum Chemistry (7th ed.), Physical Chemistry (6th ed.), Solutions Manual to Physical Chemistry (5th ed.), and a textbook on Molecular Spectroscopy. His textbooks have been translated into many languages, including Arabic, Chinese, Czech, Hungarian, Polish, Spanish and Portuguese and they have been used by many Chemistry departments in the US and elsewhere. He died on December 17, 2015.
