= Infrared spectroscopy =

Measurement of infrared radiation's interaction with matter

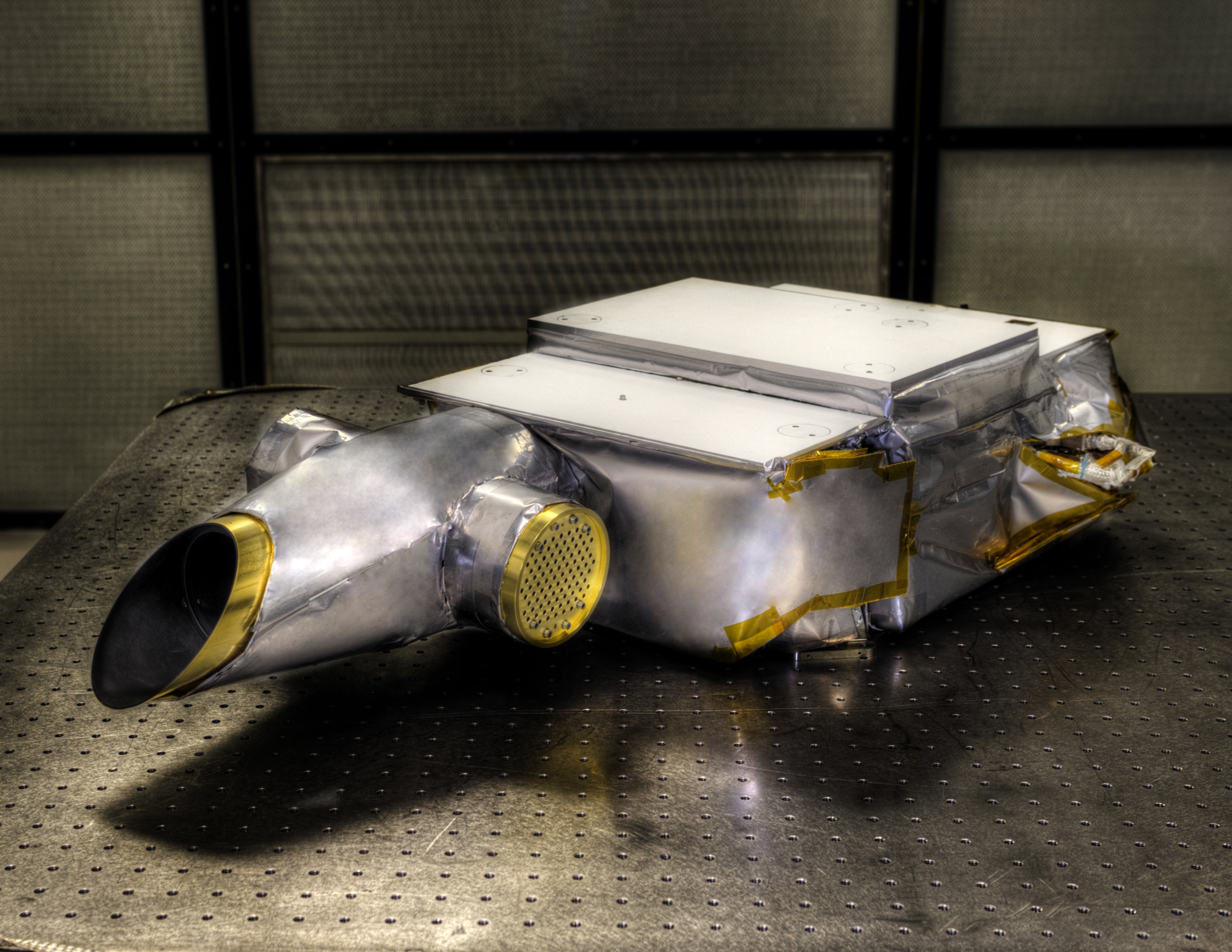
OVIRS instrument of the OSIRIS-REx probe is a visible and infrared spectrometer

Infrared spectroscopy (IR spectroscopy or vibrational spectroscopy) is the measurement of the interaction of infrared radiation with matter by absorption, emission, or reflection. It is used to study and identify chemical substances or functional groups in solid, liquid, or gaseous forms. It can be used to characterize new materials or identify and verify known and unknown samples. The method or technique of infrared spectroscopy is conducted with an instrument called an infrared spectrometer (or spectrophotometer) which produces an infrared spectrum. An IR spectrum can be visualized in a graph of infrared light absorbance (or transmittance) on the vertical axis vs. frequency, wavenumber or wavelength on the horizontal axis. Typical units of wavenumber used in IR spectra are reciprocal centimeters, with the symbol cm^{−1}. Units of IR wavelength are commonly given in micrometers (formerly called "microns"), symbol μm, which are related to the wavenumber in a reciprocal way. A common laboratory instrument that uses this technique is a Fourier transform infrared (FTIR) spectrometer. Two-dimensional IR is also possible as discussed below.

The infrared portion of the electromagnetic spectrum is usually divided into three regions; the near-, mid- and far- infrared, named for their relation to the visible spectrum. The higher-energy near-IR, approximately 14,000–4,000 cm^{−1} (0.7–2.5 μm wavelength) can excite overtone or combination modes of molecular vibrations. The mid-infrared, approximately 4,000–400 cm^{−1} (2.5–25 μm) is generally used to study the fundamental vibrations and associated rotational–vibrational structure. The far-infrared, approximately 400–10 cm^{−1} (25–1,000 μm) has low energy and may be used for rotational spectroscopy and low frequency vibrations. The region from 2–130 cm^{−1}, bordering the microwave region, is considered the terahertz region and may probe intermolecular vibrations. The names and classifications of these subregions are conventions, and are only loosely based on the relative molecular or electromagnetic properties.

== Uses and applications ==
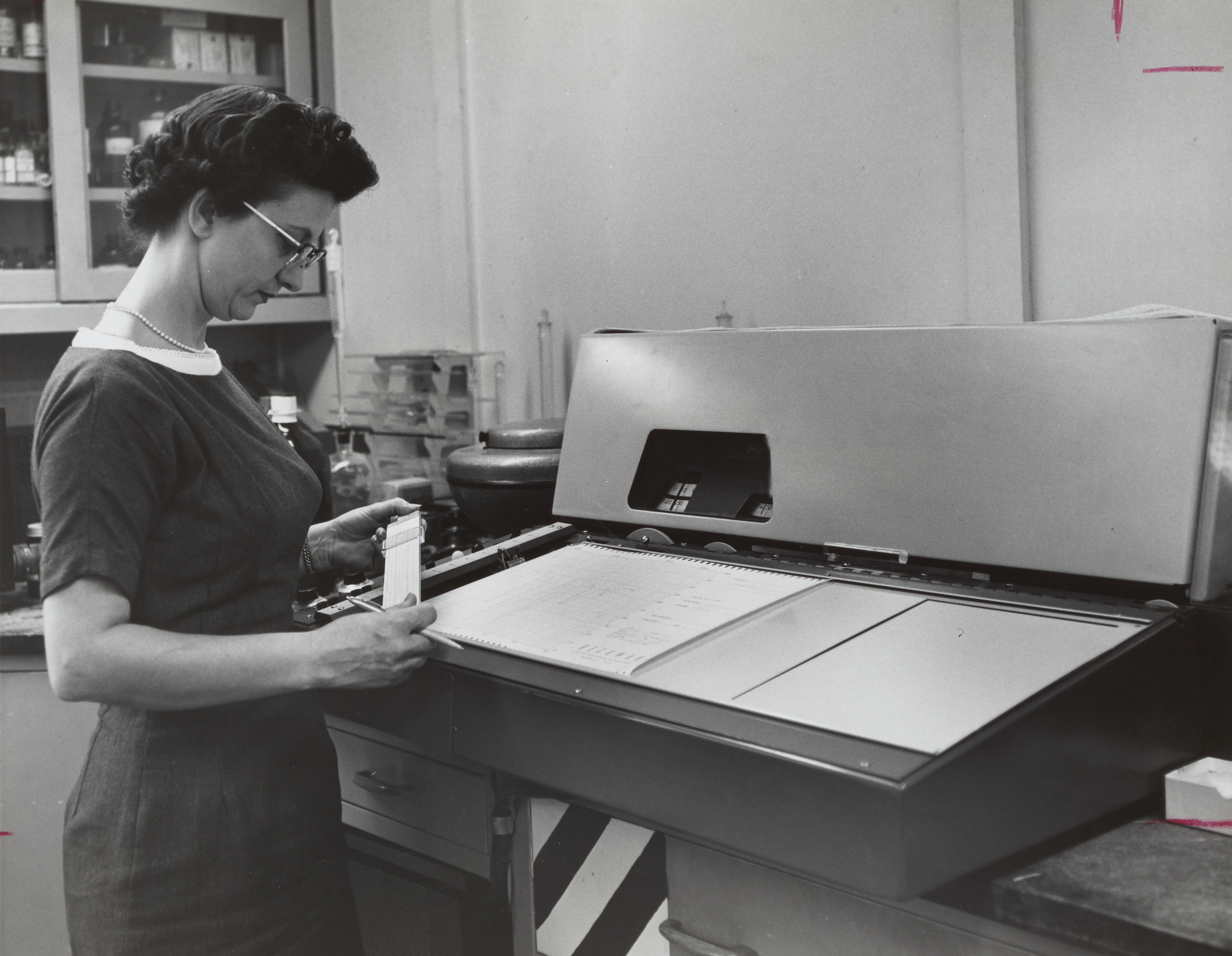
Infrared spectrophotometer used to analyze the diethyltoluamide insect repellent, 1960

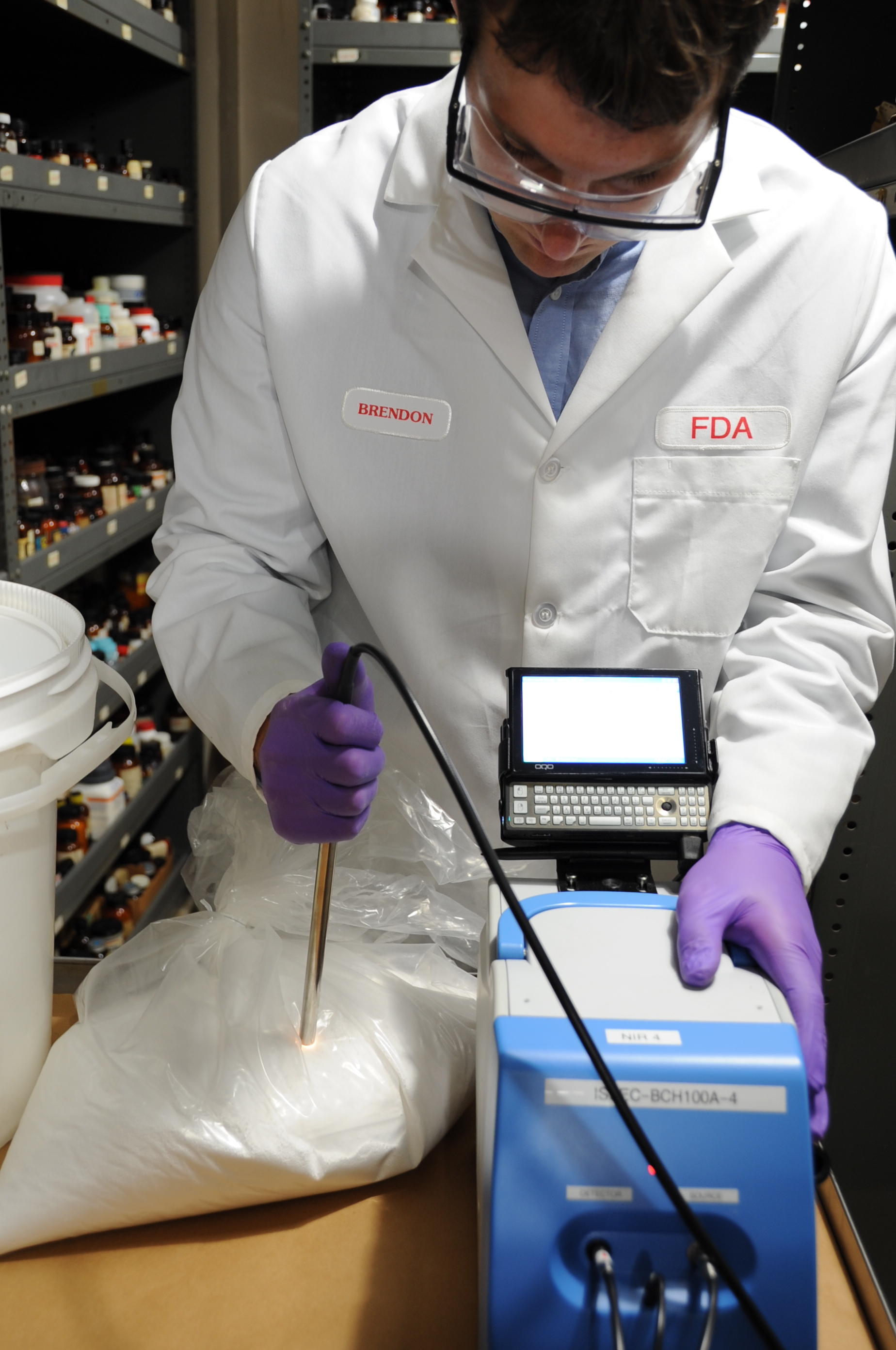
US Food and Drug Administration scientist uses portable near infrared spectroscopy device to detect potentially illegal substances

Infrared spectroscopy is a simple and reliable technique widely used in both organic and inorganic chemistry, in research and industry. It is used in quality control, dynamic measurement, and monitoring applications such as the long-term unattended measurement of CO_{2} concentrations in greenhouses and growth chambers by infrared gas analyzers.

It is also used in forensic analysis in both criminal and civil cases, for example in identifying polymer degradation. It can be used in determining the blood alcohol content of a suspected drunk driver.

IR spectroscopy has been used in identification of pigments in paintings and other art objects such as illuminated manuscripts.

Infrared spectroscopy is also useful in measuring the degree of polymerization in polymer manufacture. Changes in the character or quantity of a particular bond are assessed by measuring at a specific frequency over time. Instruments can routinely record many spectra per second in situ, providing insights into reaction mechanism (e.g., detection of intermediates) and reaction progress.

Infrared spectroscopy is utilized in the field of semiconductor microelectronics: for example, infrared spectroscopy can be applied to semiconductors like silicon, gallium arsenide, gallium nitride, zinc selenide, amorphous silicon, silicon nitride, etc.

Another important application of infrared spectroscopy is in the food industry to measure the concentration of various compounds in different food products.

Infrared spectroscopy is also used in gas leak detection devices such as the DP-IR and EyeCGAs. These devices detect hydrocarbon gas leaks in the transportation of natural gas and crude oil.

Infrared spectroscopy is an important analysis method in the recycling process of household waste plastics, and a convenient stand-off method to sort plastic of different polymers (PET, HDPE, ...).

Other developments include a miniature IR-spectrometer that's linked to a cloud based database and suitable for personal everyday use, and NIR-spectroscopic chips that can be embedded in smartphones and various gadgets.

In catalysis research it is a very useful tool to characterize the catalyst, as well as to detect intermediates.

Infrared spectroscopy coupled with machine learning and artificial intelligence also has potential for rapid, accurate and non-invasive sensing of bacteria. The complex chemical composition of bacteria, including nucleic acids, proteins, carbohydrates and fatty acids, results in high-dimensional datasets where the essential features are effectively hidden under the total spectrum. Extraction of the essential features therefore requires advanced statistical methods such as machine learning and deep-neural networks. The potential of this technique for bacteria classification have been demonstrated for differentiation at the genus, species and serotype taxonomic levels, and it has also been shown promising for antimicrobial susceptibility testing, which is important for many clinical settings where faster susceptibility testing would decrease unnecessary blind-treatment with broad-spectrum antibiotics. The main limitation of this technique for clinical applications is the high sensitivity to technical equipment and sample preparation techniques, which makes it difficult to construct large-scale databases. Attempts in this direction have however been made by Bruker with the IR Biotyper for food microbiology.

== Theory ==
Sample of an IR spec. reading; this one is from bromomethane (CH_{3}Br), showing peaks around 3000, 1300, and 1000 cm^{−1} (on the horizontal axis).

Infrared spectroscopy exploits the fact that molecules absorb frequencies that are characteristic of their structure. These absorptions occur at resonant frequencies, i.e. the frequency of the absorbed radiation matches the vibrational frequency. The energies are affected by the shape of the molecular potential energy surfaces, the masses of the atoms, and the associated vibronic coupling.

3D animation of the symmetric stretch-compress mode of the C–H bonds of bromomethane

In particular, in the Born–Oppenheimer and harmonic approximations (i.e. when the molecular Hamiltonian corresponding to the electronic ground state can be approximated by a harmonic oscillator in the neighbourhood of the equilibrium molecular geometry), the resonant frequencies are associated with the normal modes of vibration corresponding to the molecular electronic ground state potential energy surface. Thus, it depends on both the nature of the bonds and the mass of the atoms that are involved. Using the Schrödinger equation leads to the selection rule for the vibrational quantum number in the system undergoing vibrational changes:

$\bigtriangleup v =\pm 1$

The compression and extension of a bond may be likened to the behaviour of a spring, but real molecules are hardly perfectly elastic in nature. If a bond between atoms is stretched, for instance, there comes a point at which the bond breaks and the molecule dissociates into atoms. Thus real molecules deviate from perfect harmonic motion and their molecular vibrational motion is anharmonic. An empirical expression that fits the energy curve of a diatomic molecule undergoing anharmonic extension and compression to a good approximation was derived by P.M. Morse, and is called the Morse function. Using the Schrödinger equation leads to the selection rule for the system undergoing vibrational changes :

$\bigtriangleup v = \pm 1, \pm 2, \pm 3, \cdot\cdot\cdot$

=== Number of vibrational modes ===
In order for a vibrational mode in a sample to be "IR active", it must be associated with changes in the molecular dipole moment. A permanent dipole is not necessary, as the rule requires only a change in dipole moment.

A molecule can vibrate in many ways, and each way is called a vibrational mode. For molecules with N number of atoms, geometrically linear molecules have 3N – 5 degrees of vibrational modes, whereas nonlinear molecules have 3N – 6 degrees of vibrational modes (also called vibrational degrees of freedom). As examples linear carbon dioxide (CO_{2}) has 3 × 3 – 5 = 4, while non-linear water (H_{2}O), has only 3 × 3 – 6 = 3.

Stretching and bending oscillations of the CO_{2} carbon dioxide molecule. Upper left: symmetric stretching. Upper right: antisymmetric stretching. Lower line: degenerate pair of bending modes.

Simple diatomic molecules have only one bond and only one vibrational band. If the molecule is symmetrical, e.g. N_{2}, the band is not observed in the IR spectrum, but only in the Raman spectrum. Asymmetrical diatomic molecules, e.g. carbon monoxide (CO), absorb in the IR spectrum. More complex molecules have many bonds, and their vibrational spectra are correspondingly more complex, i.e. big molecules have many peaks in their IR spectra.

The atoms in a CH_{2}X_{2} group, commonly found in organic compounds and where X can represent any other atom, can vibrate in nine different ways. Six of these vibrations involve only the CH_{2} portion: two stretching modes (ν): symmetric (ν_{s}) and antisymmetric (ν_{as}); and four bending modes: scissoring (δ), rocking (ρ), wagging (ω) and twisting (τ), as shown below. Structures that do not have the two additional X groups attached have fewer modes because some modes are defined by specific relationships to those other attached groups. For example, in water, the rocking, wagging, and twisting modes do not exist because these types of motions of the H atoms represent simple rotation of the whole molecule rather than vibrations within it. In case of more complex molecules, out-of-plane (γ) vibrational modes can be also present.

| Symmetry Direction | Symmetric | Antisymmetric |
|---|---|---|
| Radial | Symmetric stretching (ν_{s}) | Antisymmetric stretching (ν_{as}) |
| Latitudinal | Scissoring (δ) | Rocking (ρ) |
| Longitudinal | Wagging (ω) | Twisting (τ) |

These figures do not represent the "recoil" of the C atoms, which, though necessarily present to balance the overall movements of the molecule, are much smaller than the movements of the lighter H atoms.

The simplest and most important or fundamental IR bands arise from the excitations of normal modes, the simplest distortions of the molecule, from the ground state with vibrational quantum number v = 0 to the first excited state with vibrational quantum number v = 1. In some cases, overtone bands are observed. An overtone band arises from the absorption of a photon leading to a direct transition from the ground state to the second excited vibrational state (v = 2). Such a band appears at approximately twice the energy of the fundamental band for the same normal mode. Some excitations, so-called combination modes, involve simultaneous excitation of more than one normal mode. The phenomenon of Fermi resonance can arise when two modes are similar in energy; Fermi resonance results in an unexpected shift in energy and intensity of the bands etc.

== Practical IR spectroscopy ==
The infrared spectrum of a sample is recorded by passing a beam of infrared light through the sample. When the frequency of the IR matches the vibrational frequency of a bond or collection of bonds, absorption occurs. Examination of the transmitted light reveals how much energy was absorbed at each frequency (or wavelength). This measurement can be achieved by scanning the wavelength range using a monochromator. Alternatively, the entire wavelength range is measured using a Fourier transform instrument and then a transmittance or absorbance spectrum is extracted.

This technique is commonly used for analyzing samples with covalent bonds. The number of bands roughly correlates with symmetry and molecular complexity.

A variety of devices are used to hold the sample in the path of the IR beam These devices are selected on the basis of their transparency in the region of interest and their resilience toward the sample.

Materials for containing IR samples
| material | transparency range (cm^{−1}) | comment |
|---|---|---|
| Sodium chloride | 5000–650 | attacked (dissolved) by water, small alcohols, some amines |
| Calcium fluoride | 4200–1300 | insoluble in most solvents |
| Silver chloride | 5000–500 | attacked (dissolved) by amines, organosulfur compounds |

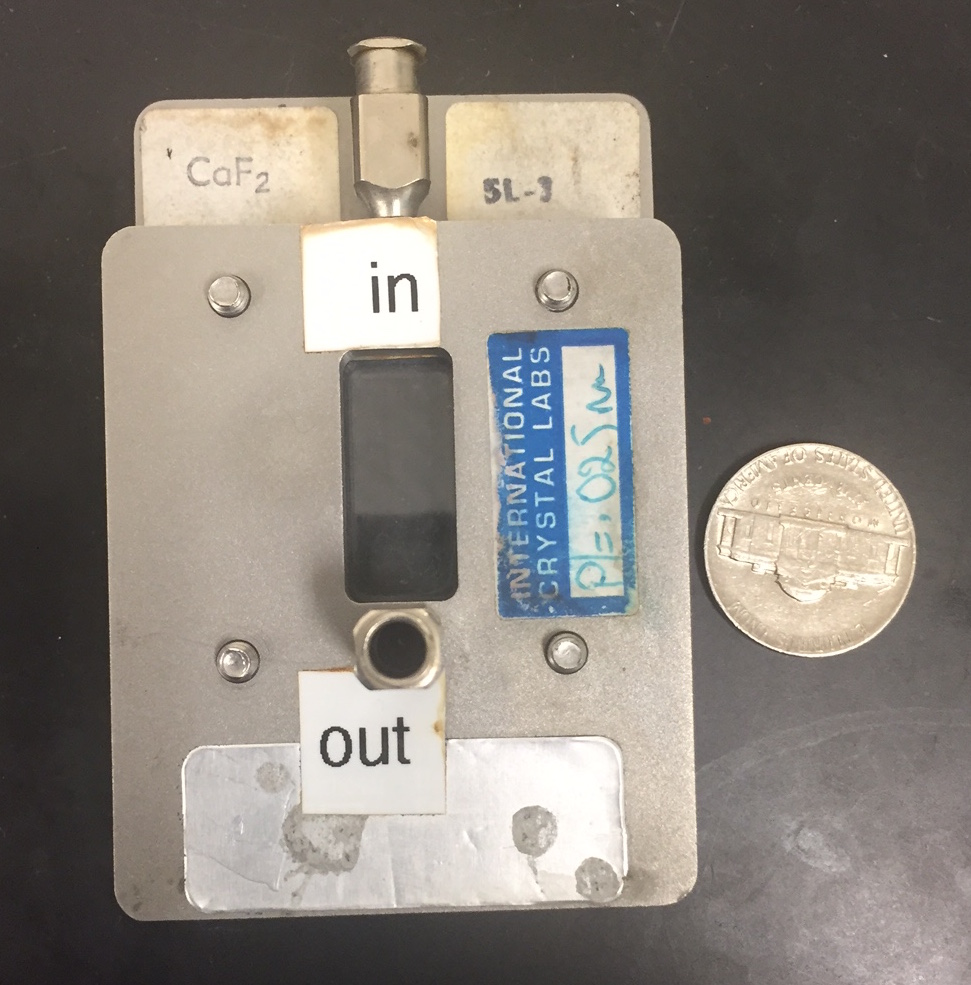
Typical IR solution cell. The windows are CaF_{2}.

=== Sample preparation ===
==== Gas samples ====
Gaseous samples require a sample cell with a long pathlength to compensate for the diluteness. The pathlength of the sample cell depends on the concentration of the compound of interest. A simple glass tube with length of 5 to 10 cm equipped with infrared-transparent windows at both ends of the tube can be used for concentrations down to several hundred ppm. Sample gas concentrations well below ppm can be measured with a White's cell in which the infrared light is guided with mirrors to travel through the gas. White's cells are available with optical pathlength starting from 0.5 m up to hundred meters.

==== Liquid samples ====
Liquid samples can be sandwiched between two plates of a salt—commonly sodium chloride, but a number of other salts such as potassium bromide or calcium fluoride are sometimes. The plates themselves are transparent in the infrared band, allowing the IR effects of the sample itself to be seen through them without substantial interference. If the IR spectrum of the plates themselves is known, this "background spectrum" can be subtracted from the experimental spectrum of the sample to remove artifacts and allow the spectrum of the substance of interest to be seen more clearly. Solutions can also be measured and then the spectrum of the solvent, which would otherwise overwhelm the experimental spectrum, to be removed.

==== Solid samples ====
Solid samples can be prepared in a variety of ways. One common method is to crush the sample with an oily mulling agent (usually mineral oil Nujol). A thin film of the mull is applied onto salt plates and measured. The second method is to grind a quantity of the sample with a specially purified salt (usually potassium bromide) finely (to remove scattering effects from large crystals). This powder mixture is then pressed in a mechanical press to form a translucent pellet through which the beam of the spectrometer can pass. A third technique is the "cast film" technique, which is used mainly for polymeric materials. The sample is first dissolved in a suitable, non-hygroscopic solvent. A drop of this solution is deposited on the surface of a KBr or NaCl cell. The solution is then evaporated to dryness and the film formed on the cell is analysed directly. Care is important to ensure that the film is not too thick otherwise light cannot pass through. This technique is suitable for qualitative analysis. The final method is to use microtomy to cut a thin (20–100 μm) film from a solid sample. This is one of the most important ways of analysing failed plastic products for example because the integrity of the solid is preserved.

In photoacoustic spectroscopy the need for sample treatment is minimal. The sample, liquid or solid, is placed into the sample cup which is inserted into the photoacoustic cell which is then sealed for the measurement. The sample may be one solid piece, powder or basically in any form for the measurement. For example, a piece of rock can be inserted into the sample cup and the spectrum measured from it.

A useful way of analyzing solid samples without the need for cutting samples uses ATR or attenuated total reflectance spectroscopy. Using this approach, samples are pressed against the face of a single crystal. The infrared radiation passes through the crystal and only interacts with the sample at the interface between the two materials.

=== Comparing to a reference ===
Schematics of a two-beam absorption spectrometer. A beam of infrared light is produced, passed through an monochromator (not shown), and then split into two separate beams. One is passed through the sample, the other passed through a reference. The beams are both reflected back towards a detector, however first they pass through a splitter, which quickly alternates which of the two beams enters the detector. The two signals are then compared and a printout is obtained. This "two-beam" setup gives accurate spectra even if the intensity of the light source drifts over time.

It is typical to record spectrum of both the sample and a "reference". This step controls for a number of variables, e.g. infrared detector, which may affect the spectrum. The reference measurement makes it possible to eliminate the instrument influence.

The appropriate "reference" depends on the measurement and its goal. The simplest reference measurement is to simply remove the sample (replacing it by air). However, sometimes a different reference is more useful. For example, if the sample is a dilute solute dissolved in water in a beaker, then a good reference measurement might be to measure pure water in the same beaker. Then the reference measurement would cancel out not only all the instrumental properties (like what light source is used), but also the light-absorbing and light-reflecting properties of the water and beaker, and the final result would just show the properties of the solute (at least approximately).

A common way to compare to a reference is sequentially: first measure the reference, then replace the reference by the sample and measure the sample. This technique is not perfectly reliable; if the infrared lamp is a bit brighter during the reference measurement, then a bit dimmer during the sample measurement, the measurement will be distorted. More elaborate methods, such as a "two-beam" setup (see figure), can correct for these types of effects to give very accurate results. The Standard addition method can be used to statistically cancel these errors.

Nevertheless, among different absorption-based techniques which are used for gaseous species detection, Cavity ring-down spectroscopy (CRDS) can be used as a calibration-free method. The fact that CRDS is based on the measurements of photon life-times (and not the laser intensity) makes it needless for any calibration and comparison with a reference

Some instruments also automatically identify the substance being measured from a store of thousands of reference spectra held in storage.

=== FTIR ===
An interferogram from an FTIR measurement. The horizontal axis is the position of the mirror, and the vertical axis is the amount of light detected. This is the "raw data" which can be Fourier transformed to get the actual spectrum.

Fourier transform infrared (FTIR) spectroscopy provides infrared spectra. Infrared light is guided through an interferometer and then through the sample (or vice versa). A moving mirror inside the apparatus alters the distribution of infrared energies that pass through the interferometer. The signal directly recorded, called an "interferogram", represents light output as a function of mirror position. A data-processing technique called Fourier transform converts this raw data into the desired result (the sample's spectrum): light output as a function of infrared wavelength (or equivalently, wavenumber). As described above, the sample's spectrum is always compared to a reference.

An alternate method for acquiring spectra is the "dispersive" or "scanning monochromator" method. In this approach, the sample is irradiated sequentially with various single wavelengths. The dispersive method is more common in UV-Vis spectroscopy, but is less practical in the infrared than the FTIR method. One reason that FTIR is favored is called "Fellgett's advantage" or the "multiplex advantage": The information at all frequencies is collected simultaneously, improving both speed and signal-to-noise ratio. Another is called "Jacquinot's Throughput Advantage": A dispersive measurement requires detecting much lower light levels than an FTIR measurement. There are other advantages, as well as some disadvantages, but virtually all modern infrared spectrometers are FTIR instruments.

=== Infrared microscopy ===
Various forms of infrared microscopy exist. These include IR versions of sub-diffraction microscopy such as IR NSOM, photothermal microspectroscopy, Nano-FTIR and atomic force microscope based infrared spectroscopy (AFM-IR).

=== Other methods in molecular vibrational spectroscopy ===
Infrared spectroscopy is not the only method of studying molecular vibrational spectra. Raman spectroscopy involves an inelastic scattering process in which only part of the energy of an incident photon is absorbed by the molecule, and the remaining part is scattered and detected. The energy difference corresponds to absorbed vibrational energy.

The selection rules for infrared and for Raman spectroscopy are different at least for some molecular symmetries, so that the two methods are complementary in that they observe vibrations of different symmetries.

Another method is electron energy loss spectroscopy (EELS), in which the energy absorbed is provided by an inelastically scattered electron rather than a photon. This method is useful for studying vibrations of molecules adsorbed on a solid surface.

high-resolution EELS (HREELS) is a technique for performing vibrational spectroscopy in a transmission electron microscope (TEM). In combination with the high spatial resolution of the TEM, unprecedented experiments have been performed, such as nano-scale temperature measurements, mapping of isotopically labeled molecules, mapping of phonon modes in position- and momentum-space, vibrational surface and bulk mode mapping on nanocubes, and investigations of polariton modes in van der Waals crystals. Analysis of vibrational modes that are IR-inactive but appear in inelastic neutron scattering is also possible at high spatial resolution using EELS.

=== Computational infrared microscopy ===
By using computer simulations and normal mode analysis it is possible to calculate theoretical frequencies of molecules.

== Absorption bands ==
IR spectroscopy is often used to identify structures because functional groups give rise to characteristic bands both in terms of intensity and position (frequency). The positions of these bands are summarized in correlation tables as shown below.

List of main IR spectroscopy bands. For example, the carboxyl group will contain a C = O band at 1700 cm^{−1} and an OH band at 3500 cm^{−1} (total group -COOH). Wavenumbers listed in cm^{−1}.

=== Regions ===
A spectrograph is often interpreted as having two regions.

- functional group region $\geq 1,500 \text{ cm}^{-1}$

In the functional region there are one to a few troughs per functional group.

- fingerprint region $< 1,500 \text{ cm}^{-1}$

In the fingerprint region there are many troughs which form an intricate pattern which can be used like a fingerprint to determine the compound.

=== Badger's rule ===
For many kinds of samples, the assignments are known, i.e. which bond deformation(s) are associated with which frequency. In such cases further information can be gleaned about the strength on a bond, relying on the empirical guideline called Badger's rule. Originally published by Richard McLean Badger in 1934, this rule states that the strength of a bond (in terms of force constant) correlates with the bond length. That is, increase in bond strength leads to corresponding bond shortening and vice versa.

== Isotope effects ==
The different isotopes in a particular species may exhibit different fine details in infrared spectroscopy. For example, the O–O stretching frequency (in reciprocal centimeters) of oxyhemocyanin is experimentally determined to be 832 and 788 cm^{−1} for ν(^{16}O–^{16}O) and ν(^{18}O–^{18}O), respectively.

By considering the O–O bond as a spring, the frequency of absorbance can be calculated as a wavenumber [= frequency/(speed of light)]

$$\tilde{\nu} = \frac{1}{2 \pi c} \sqrt{\frac{k}{\mu}}$$

where k is the spring constant for the bond, c is the speed of light, and μ is the reduced mass of the A–B system:

$$\mu = \frac{m_\mathrm A m_\mathrm B}{m_\mathrm A + m_\mathrm B}$$

($m_i$ is the mass of atom $i$).

The reduced masses for ^{16}O–^{16}O and ^{18}O–^{18}O can be approximated as 8 and 9 respectively. Thus

$$\frac{\tilde{\nu}(^{16}\mathrm O)}{\tilde{\nu}(^{18}\mathrm O)} = \sqrt{\frac{9}{8}} \approx \frac{832}{788}.$$

The effect of isotopes, both on the vibration and the decay dynamics, has been found to be stronger than previously thought. In some systems, such as silicon and germanium, the decay of the anti-symmetric stretch mode of interstitial oxygen involves the symmetric stretch mode with a strong isotope dependence. For example, it was shown that for a natural silicon sample, the lifetime of the anti-symmetric vibration is 11.4 ps. When the isotope of one of the silicon atoms is increased to ^{29}Si, the lifetime increases to 19 ps. In similar manner, when the silicon atom is changed to ^{30}Si, the lifetime becomes 27 ps.

== Two-dimensional IR ==
Two-dimensional infrared correlation spectroscopy analysis combines multiple samples of infrared spectra to reveal more complex properties. By extending the spectral information of a perturbed sample, spectral analysis is simplified and resolution is enhanced. The 2D synchronous and 2D asynchronous spectra represent a graphical overview of the spectral changes due to a perturbation (such as a changing concentration or changing temperature) as well as the relationship between the spectral changes at two different wavenumbers.

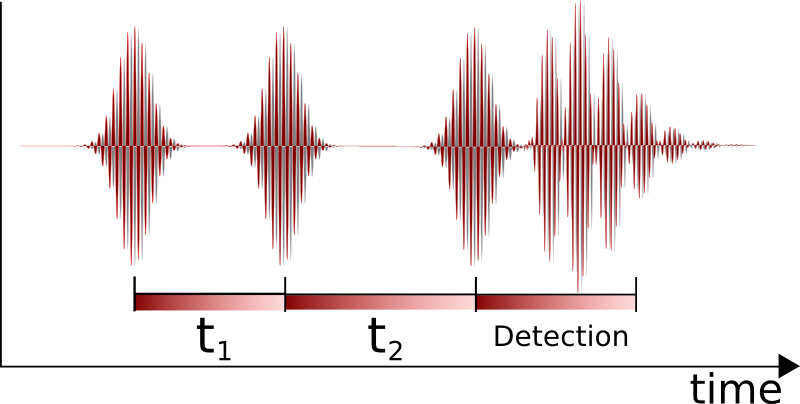
Pulse Sequence used to obtain a two-dimensional Fourier transform infrared spectrum. The time period $\tau_1$ is usually referred to as the coherence time and the second time period $\tau_2$ is known as the waiting time. The excitation frequency is obtained by Fourier transforming along the $\tau_1$ axis.

Nonlinear two-dimensional infrared spectroscopy is the infrared version of correlation spectroscopy. Nonlinear two-dimensional infrared spectroscopy is a technique that has become available with the development of femtosecond infrared laser pulses. In this experiment, first a set of pump pulses is applied to the sample. This is followed by a waiting time during which the system is allowed to relax. The typical waiting time lasts from zero to several picoseconds, and the duration can be controlled with a resolution of tens of femtoseconds. A probe pulse is then applied, resulting in the emission of a signal from the sample. The nonlinear two-dimensional infrared spectrum is a two-dimensional correlation plot of the frequency ω_{1} that was excited by the initial pump pulses and the frequency ω_{3} excited by the probe pulse after the waiting time. This allows the observation of coupling between different vibrational modes; because of its extremely fine time resolution, it can be used to monitor molecular dynamics on a picosecond timescale. It is still a largely unexplored technique and is becoming increasingly popular for fundamental research.

As with two-dimensional nuclear magnetic resonance (2DNMR) spectroscopy, this technique spreads the spectrum in two dimensions and allows for the observation of cross peaks that contain information on the coupling between different modes. In contrast to 2DNMR, nonlinear two-dimensional infrared spectroscopy also involves the excitation to overtones. These excitations result in excited state absorption peaks located below the diagonal and cross peaks. In 2DNMR, two distinct techniques, COSY and NOESY, are frequently used. The cross peaks in the first are related to the scalar coupling, while in the latter they are related to the spin transfer between different nuclei. In nonlinear two-dimensional infrared spectroscopy, analogs have been drawn to these 2DNMR techniques. Nonlinear two-dimensional infrared spectroscopy with zero waiting time corresponds to COSY, and nonlinear two-dimensional infrared spectroscopy with finite waiting time allowing vibrational population transfer corresponds to NOESY. The COSY variant of nonlinear two-dimensional infrared spectroscopy has been used for determination of the secondary structure content of proteins.

== See also ==
- Applied spectroscopy
- Astrochemistry
- Atomic and molecular astrophysics
- Atomic force microscopy based infrared spectroscopy (AFM-IR)
- Cosmochemistry
- Far-infrared astronomy
- Forensic chemistry
- Forensic engineering
- Forensic polymer engineering
- Infrared astronomy
- Infrared microscopy
- Infrared multiphoton dissociation
- Infrared photodissociation spectroscopy
- Infrared spectroscopy correlation table
- Infrared spectroscopy of metal carbonyls
- Kinetic theory of gases
- Near-infrared spectroscopy
- Nuclear resonance vibrational spectroscopy
- Photothermal microspectroscopy
- Raman spectroscopy
- Rotational-vibrational spectroscopy
- Time-resolved spectroscopy
- Vibrational spectroscopy of linear molecules
