= Overtone band =

In vibrational spectroscopy, an overtone band is the spectral band that occurs in a vibrational spectrum of a molecule when the molecule makes a transition from the ground state (v=0) to the second excited state (v=2), where v is the vibrational quantum number (a non-negative integer) obtained from solving the Schrödinger equation for the molecule.

Generally, in order to study the vibrational spectra of molecules, chemical bond vibrations are assumed to be approximable as simple harmonic oscillators. Thus, a quadratic potential is used in the Schrödinger equation to solve for the vibrational energy eigenstates and their eigenvalues. These energy states are quantized, meaning they can assume only some "discrete" values of energy. When electromagnetic radiation is shone on a sample, the molecules can absorb energy from the radiation and change their vibrational energy state. However, the molecules can absorb energy from radiation only under certain condition, namely- there should be a change in the electric dipole moment of the molecule when it is vibrating. This change in the electric dipole moment of the molecule leads to the transition dipole moment of the molecule, for transition from the lower to higher energy state, being non-zero which is an essential condition for any transition to take place in the vibrational state of the molecule (due to selection rules).

Importantly, under the simple harmonic approximation, it can be shown that the transition dipole moment is non-zero only for transitions where ∆v=±1. Hence for an ideal, simple-harmonically vibrating bond, the vibrational spectrum contains no overtones. Of course, real molecules do not vibrate perfectly harmonically, because a bond's potential is not precisely quadratic but better approximated as a Morse potential. Solving the Schrödinger equation with the Morse potential for the molecule under consideration yields vibrational energy eigenstates with the interesting property that when one calculates transition dipole moments for various vibrational energy level transitions, the transition dipole moment is not zero for the transitions where ∆v=±2,±3,±4, etc. Thus, for real molecules, the allowed transitions are those for which ∆v=±1,±2,±3,±4, etc. The overtone band observed in the IR spectrum is one such transition with ∆v=2, from v=0 to v=2 energy state.

It has been experimentally found that the intensity of the overtone band is very low compared to the fundamental band, validating the harmonic approximation.

== See also ==
- Near-infrared spectroscopy
