= Nano-FTIR =

Infrared microscopy technique

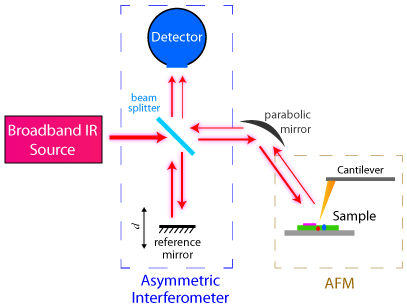
The schematic representation of a nano-FTIR system with a broadband infrared source.

Nano-FTIR (nanoscale Fourier transform infrared spectroscopy) is a scanning probe technique that utilizes as a combination of two techniques: Fourier transform infrared spectroscopy (FTIR) and scattering-type scanning near-field optical microscopy (s-SNOM). As s-SNOM, nano-FTIR is based on atomic-force microscopy (AFM), where a sharp tip is illuminated by an external light source and the tip-scattered light (typically back-scattered) is detected as a function of tip position. A typical nano-FTIR setup thus consists of an atomic force microscope, a broadband infrared light source used for tip illumination, and a Michelson interferometer acting as Fourier-transform spectrometer. In nano-FTIR, the sample stage is placed in one of the interferometer arms, which allows for recording both amplitude and phase of the detected light (unlike conventional FTIR that normally does not yield phase information). Scanning the tip allows for performing hyperspectral imaging (i.e. complete spectrum at every pixel of the scanned area) with nanoscale spatial resolution determined by the tip apex size. The use of broadband infrared sources enables the acquisition of continuous spectra, which is a distinctive feature of nano-FTIR compared to s-SNOM. Nano-FTIR is capable of performing infrared (IR) spectroscopy of materials in ultrasmall quantities and with nanoscale spatial resolution. The detection of a single molecular complex and the sensitivity to a single monolayer has been shown. Recording infrared spectra as a function of position can be used for nanoscale mapping of the sample chemical composition, performing a local ultrafast IR spectroscopy and analyzing the nanoscale intermolecular coupling, among others. A spatial resolution of 10 nm to 20 nm is routinely achieved.

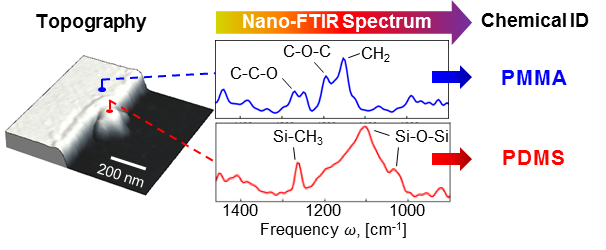
Nanoscale chemical identification with nano-FTIR: local spectroscopy performed by nano-FTIR allowed for chemical identification of a nanoscale contaminant – a Polydimethylsiloxane (PDMS) particle – adjacent to a Poly(methyl methacrylate) (PMMA) film.

For organic compounds, polymers, biological and other soft matter, nano-FTIR spectra can be directly compared to the standard FTIR databases, which allows for a straightforward chemical identification and characterization.

Nano-FTIR does not require special sample preparation and is typically performed under ambient conditions. It uses an AFM operated in noncontact mode that is intrinsically nondestructive and sufficiently gentle to be suitable for soft-matter and biological sample investigations. Nano-FTIR can be utilized from THz to visible spectral range (and not only in infrared as its name suggests) depending on the application requirements and availability of broadband sources. Nano-FTIR is complementary to tip-enhanced Raman spectroscopy (TERS), SNOM, AFM-IR and other scanning probe methods that are capable of performing vibrational analysis.

== Basic principles ==
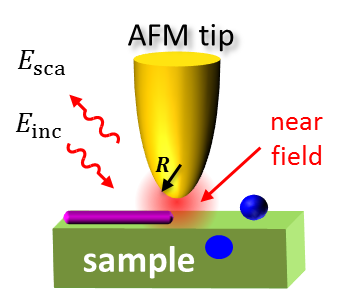
Principles of near-field probing: the sample is analyzed via scattering from a sharp, externally illuminated probe

Nano-FTIR is based on s-SNOM, where the infrared beam from a light source is focused onto a sharp, typically metalized AFM tip and the backscattering is detected. The tip greatly enhances the illuminating IR light in the nanoscopic volume around its apex, creating a strong near field. A sample, brought into this near field, interacts with the tip electromagnetically and modifies the tip (back)scattering in the process. Thus by detecting tip scattering, one can obtain information about the sample.

Nano-FTIR detects the tip-scattered light interferometrically. The sample stage is placed into one arm of a conventional Michelson interferometer, while a mirror on a piezo stage is placed into another, reference arm. Recording the backscattered signal while translating the reference mirror yields an interferogram. The subsequent Fourier transform of this interferogram returns the near-field spectra of the sample.

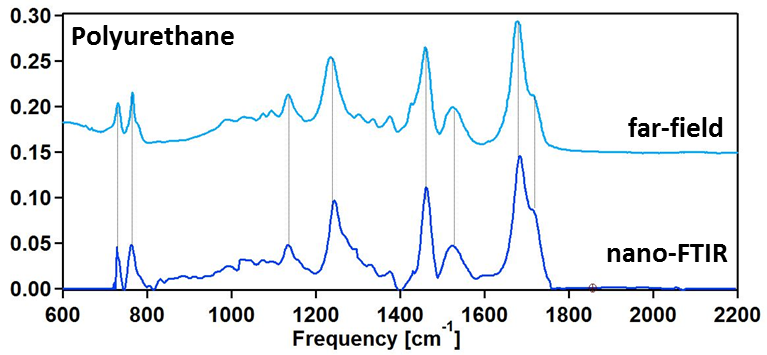
nano-FTIR absorption and far-field FTIR (ATR modality) spectra measured on the same polymer sample show great agreement.

Placement of the sample stage into one of the interferometer's arms (instead of outside of the interferometer as typically implemented in conventional FTIR) is a key element of nano-FTIR. It boosts the weak near-field signal due to interference with the strong reference field, helps to eliminate the background caused by parasitic scattering off everything that falls into large diffraction-limited beam focus, and most importantly, allows for recording of both amplitude s and phase φ spectra of the tip-scattered radiation. With the detection of phase, nano-FTIR provides complete information about near fields, which is essential for quantitative studies and many other applications. For example, for soft matter samples (organics, polymers, biomaterials, etc.), φ directly relates to the absorption in the sample material. This permits a direct comparison of nano-FTIR spectra with conventional absorption spectra of the sample material, thus allowing for simple spectroscopic identification according to standard FTIR databases.

== History ==
Nano-FTIR was first described in 2005 in a patent by Ocelic and Hillenbrand as Fourier-transform spectroscopy of tip-scattered light with an asymmetric spectrometer (i.e. the tip/sample placed inside one of the interferometer arms). The first realization of s-SNOM with FTIR was demonstrated in 2006 in the laboratory of F. Keilmann using a mid-infrared source based on a simple version of nonlinear difference-frequency generation (DFG). However, the mid-IR spectra in this realization were recorded using dual comb spectroscopy principles, yielding a discrete set of frequencies and thus demonstrating a multiheterodyne imaging technique rather than nano-FTIR. The first continuous spectra were recorded only in 2009 in the same laboratory using a supercontinuum IR beam also obtained by DFG in GaSe upon superimposing two pulsed trains emitted from Er-doped fiber laser. This source further allowed in 2011 for the first assessment of nanoscale-resolved spectra of SiC with excellent quality and spectral resolution. At the same time, Huth et al. in the laboratory of R. Hillenbrand used IR radiation from a simple glowbar source in combination with the principles of Fourier-transform spectroscopy, to record IR spectra of p-doped Si and its oxides in a semiconductor device. In the same work the term nano-FTIR was first introduced. However, an insufficient spectral irradiance of glowbar sources limited the applicability of the technique to the detection of strongly-resonant excitations such phonons; and the early supercontinuum IR laser sources, while providing more power, had very narrow bandwidth (<300 cm^{−1}). Further attempt to improve the spectral power, while retaining the large bandwidth of a glowbar source was made by utilizing the IR radiation from a high temperature argon arc source (also known as plasma source). However, due to lack of commercial availability and rapid development of the IR supercontinium laser sources, plasma sources are not widely utilized in nano-FTIR.

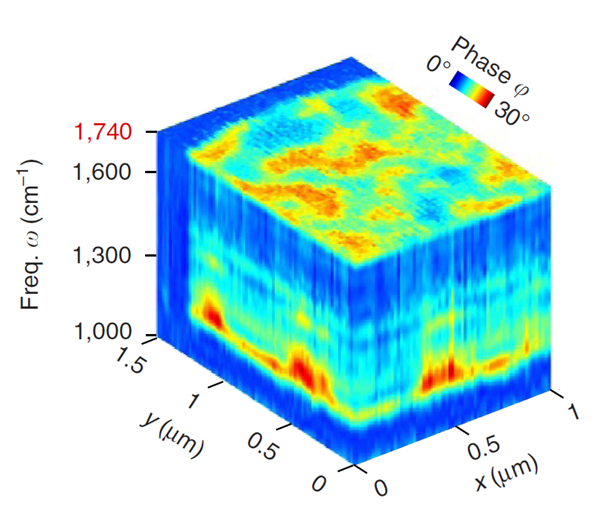
Hyperspectral image of a copolymer blend acquired by nano-FTIR

The breakthrough in nano-FTIR came upon the development of high-power broadband mid-IR laser sources, which provided large spectral irradiance in a sufficiently large bandwidth (mW-level power in ~1000 cm-1 bandwidth) and enabled truly broadband nanoscale-resolved material spectroscopy capable of detecting even the weakest vibrational resonances. Particularly, it has been shown that nano-FTIR is capable of measuring molecular fingerprints which match well with far-field FTIR spectra, owing to the asymmetry of the nano-FTIR spectrometer that provides phase and thus gives access to the molecular absorption. Recently, the first nanoscale-resolved infrared hyperspectral imaging of a co-polymer blend was demonstrated, which allowed for the application of statistical techniques such as multivariate analysis – a widely used tool for heterogeneous sample analysis.

Additional boost to the development of nano-FTIR came from the utilization of the synchrotron radiation that provide extreme bandwidth, yet at the expense of weaker IR spectral irradiance compared to broadband laser sources.

== Commercialization ==
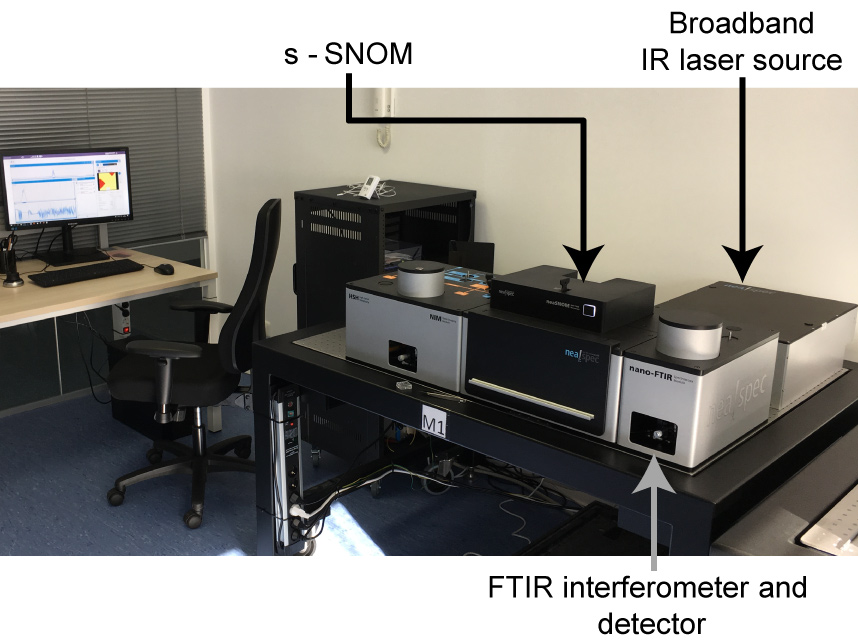
Nano-FTIR integrated with s-SNOM (neaSNOM) with all three base components marked by arrows.

The nano-FTIR technology has been commercialized by neaspec – a Germany-based spin-off company of the Max Planck Institute of Biochemistry founded by Ocelic, Hillenbrand and Keilmann in 2007 and based on the original patent by Ocelic and Hillenbrand. The detection module optimized for broadband illumination sources was first made available in 2010 as a part of the standard neaSNOM microscope system. At this time, broadband IR-lasers have not been yet commercially available, however experimental broadband IR-lasers prove that the technology works perfect and that it has a huge application potential across many disciplines. The first nano-FTIR was commercially available in 2012 (supplied with still experimental broadband IR-laser sources), becoming the first commercial system for broadband infrared nano-spectroscopy. In 2015 neaspec develops and introduces Ultrafast nano-FTIR, the commercial version of ultrafast nano-spectroscopy. Ultrafast nano-FTIR is a ready-to-use upgrade for nano-FTIR to enable pump-probe nano-spectroscopy at best-in-class spatial resolution. The same year the development of a cryo-neaSNOM – the first system of its kind to enable nanoscale near-field imaging & spectroscopy at cryogenic temperatures – was announced.

== Advanced capabilities ==
=== Synchrotron beamlines integration ===
Nano-FTIR systems can be easily integrated into synchrotron radiation beamlines. The use of synchrotron radiation allows for acquisition of an entire mid-infrared spectrum at once. Synchrotrons radiation has already been utilized in synchrotron infrared microscopectroscopy - the technique most widely used in biosciences, providing information on chemistry on microscales of virtually all biological specimens, like bone, plants, and other biological tissues. Nano-FTIR brings the spatial resolution to 10-20 nm scale (vs. ~2-5 μm in microspectroscopy), which has been utilized for broadband spatially-resolved spectroscopy of crystalline and phase-change materials, semiconductors, minerals, biominerals and proteins.

=== Ultrafast spectroscopy ===
Nano-FTIR is highly suitable for performing local ultrafast pump-probe spectroscopy due to intereferometric detection and an intrinsic ability to vary the probe delay time. It has been applied for studies of ultrafast nanoscale plasmonic phenomena in Graphene, for performing nanospectroscopy of InAs nanowires with subcycle resolution and for probing the coherent vibrational dynamics of nanoscopic ensembles.

=== Quantitative studies ===
The availability of both amplitude and phase of the scattered field and theoretically well understood signal formation in nano-FTIR allow for the recovery of both real and imaginary parts of the dielectric function, i.e. finding the index of refraction and the extinction coefficient of the sample. While such recovery for arbitrarily-shaped samples or samples exhibiting collective excitations, such as phonons, requires a resource-demanding numerical optimization, for soft matter samples (polymers, biological matter and other organic materials) the recovery of the dielectric function could often be performed in real time using fast semi-analytical approaches. One of such approaches is based on the Taylor expansion of the scattered field with respect to a small parameter that isolates the dielectric properties of the sample and allows for a polynomial representation of measured near-field contrast. With an adequate tip-sample interaction model and with known measurement parameters (e.g. tapping amplitude, demodulation order, reference material, etc.), the sample permittivity $\epsilon(\omega)$ can be determined as a solution of a simple polynomial equation

=== Subsurface analysis ===
Near-field methods, including nano-FTIR, are typically viewed as a technique for surface studies due to short probing ranges of about couple tip radii (~20-50 nm). However it has been demonstrated that within such probing ranges, s-SNOM is capable of detecting subsurface features to some extents, which could be used for the investigations of samples capped by thin protective layers, or buried polymers, among others.

As a direct consequence of being quantitative technique (i.e. capable of highly reproducible detection of both near-field amplitude & phase and well understood near-field interaction models), nano-FTIR also provides means for the quantitative studies of the sample interior (within the probing range of the tip near field, of course). This is often achieved by a simple method of utilizing signals recorded at multiple demodulation orders naturally returned by nano-FTIR in the process of background suppression. It has been shown that higher harmonics probe smaller volumes below the tip, thus encoding the volumetric structure of a sample. This way, nano-FTIR has a demonstrated capability for the recovery of thickness and permittivity of layered films and nanostructures, which has been utilized for the nanoscale depth profiling of multiphase materials and high-Tc cuprate nanoconstriction devices patterned by focused ion beams. In other words, nano-FTIR has a unique capability of recovering the same information about thin-film samples that is typically returned by ellipsometry or impedance spectroscopy, yet with nanoscale spatial resolution. This capability proved crucial for disentangling different surface states in topological insulators.

=== Operation in liquid ===
Nano-FTIR uses scattered IR light to obtain information about the sample and has the potential to investigate electrochemical interfaces in-situ/operando and biological (or other) samples in their natural environment, such as water. The feasibility of such investigations has already been demonstrated by acquisition of nano-FTIR spectra through a capping Graphene layer on top of a supported material or through Graphene suspended on a perforated silicon nitride membrane (using the same s-SNOM platform that nano-FTIR utilizes).

=== Cryogenic environment ===
Reveling the fundamentals of phase transitions in superconductors, correlated oxides, Bose-Einstein condensates of surface polaritons, etc. require spectroscopic studies at the characteristically nanometer length scales and in cryogenic environment. Nano-FTIR is compatible with cryogenic s-SNOM that has already been utilized for reveling a nanotextured coexistence of metal and correlated Mott insulator phases in Vanadium oxide near the metal-insulator transition.

=== Special atmosphere environments ===
Nano-FTIR can be operated in different atmospheric environments by enclosing the system into an isolated chamber or a glove box. Such operation has already been used for the investigation of highly reactive Lithium-ion battery components.

== Applications ==
Nano-FTIR has a plenitude of applications, including polymers and polymer composites, organic films, semiconductors, biological research (cell membranes, proteins structure, studies of single viruses), chemistry and catalysis, photochemistry, minerals and biominerals, geochemistry, corrosion and materials sciences, low-dimensional materials, photonics, energy storage, cosmetics, pharmacology and environmental sciences.

=== Materials and chemical sciences ===
Nano-FTIR has been used for the nanoscale spectroscopic chemical identification of polymers and nanocomposites, for in situ investigation of structure and crystallinity of organic thin films, for strain characterization and relaxation in crystalline materials and for high-resolution spatial mapping of catalytic reactions, among others.

=== Biological and pharmaceutical sciences ===
Nano-FTIR has been used for investigation of protein secondary structure, bacterial membrane, detection and studies of single viruses and protein complexes. It has been applied to the detection of biominerals in bone tissue. Nano-FTIR, when coupled with THz light, can also be applied to cancer and burn imaging with high optical contrast.

=== Semiconductor industry and research ===
Nano-FTIR has been used for nanoscale free carrier profiling and quantification of free carrier concentration in semiconductor devices, for evaluation of ion beam damage in nanoconstriction devices, and general spectroscopic characterization of semiconductor materials.

== Theory ==
=== High-harmonic demodulation for background suppression ===
The nano-FTIR interferometrically detects light scattered from the tip-sample system, $E_{\rm sca}$. The power at the detector can be written as

$I_{\rm det} \propto |E_{\rm sca}+E_{\rm ref}|^2$

where $E_{\rm ref}$ is the reference field. The scattered field can be written as

$E_{\rm sca}=E_{\rm bg}+E_{\rm nf}$

and is dominated by parasitic background scattering, $E_{\rm bg}$, from the tip shaft, cantilever sample roughness and everything else which falls into the diffraction-limited beam focus. To extract the near-field signal, $E_{\rm nf}$, originating from the "hot-spot" below the tip apex (which carries the nanoscale-resolved information about the sample properties) a small harmonic modulation of the tip height H (i.e. oscillating the tip) with frequency Ω is provided and the detector signal is demodulated at higher harmonics of this frequency nΩ with n=1,2,3,4,... The background is nearly insensitive to small variations of the tip height and is nearly eliminated for sufficiently high demodulation orders (typically $n\ge 2$). Mathematically this can be shown by expanding $E_{\rm bg}$ and $E_{\rm nf}$ into a Fourier series, which yields the following (approximated) expression for the demodulated detector signal:

$I_{n} \propto E_{\rm ref}^*E_{\rm nf,n}+E_{\rm bg,0}^*E_{\rm nf,n}+{\rm C.C.}$

where $I_{n}=s_n {\rm e}^{{\rm i}\phi_n}$ is the complex-valued number that is obtained by combining the lock-in amplitude, $s_n$, and phase, $\phi_n$, signals, $E_{\rm nf,n}$ is the n-th Fourier coefficient of the near-field contribution and C. C. stands for the complex conjugate terms. $E_{\rm bg,0}$ is the zeroth-order Fourier coefficient of the background contribution and is often called the multiplicative background because it enters the detector signal as a product with $E_{\rm nf,n}$. It cannot be removed by the high-harmonic demodulation alone. In nano-FTIR the multiplicative background is eliminated as described below.

=== Asymmetric FTIR spectrometer ===
To acquire a spectrum, the reference mirror is continuously translated while recording the demodulated detector signal as a function of the reference mirror position $x$, yielding an interferogram $I_n(x)$. This way the phase of the reference field changes according to $\phi_{\rm ref}=x\omega/c$ for each spectral component of the reference field $\omega$ and the detector signal can thus be written as

$I_n(x)\propto \int {\rm d}\omega\left(E_{\rm ref,0}^*E_{{\rm nf},n}{\rm e}^{-{\rm i}x\omega/c}+E_{\rm bg,0}^*E_{{\rm nf},n}+{\rm C.C.}\right)$

where $E_{\rm ref,0}$ is the reference field at zero delay $x=0$. To obtain the nano-FTIR spectrum, $\tilde{I}_n(\omega)$, the interferogram $I_n(x)$ is Fourier-transformed with respect to $x$. The second term in the above equation does not depend on the reference mirror position and after the Fourier transformation contributes only to the DC signal. Thus for $\omega>0$ only the near-field contribution multiplied by the reference field stays in the acquired spectrum:

$\tilde{I}_n(\omega)\propto E_{\rm ref,0}^*E_{{\rm nf},n}$

This way, besides providing the interferometric gain, the asymmetric interferometer utilized in nano-FTIR also eliminates the multiplicative background, which otherwise could be a source of various artifacts and is often overlooked in other s-SNOM based spectroscopies.

=== Normalization ===
Following the standard FTIR practice, spectra in nano-FTIR are normalized to those obtained on a known, preferably spectrally-flat reference material. This eliminates the generally unknown reference field and any instrumental functions, yielding spectra of the near-field contrast:

$\eta_n(\omega)=\frac{\tilde{I}_n(\omega)}{\tilde{I}_n^{\rm ref}(\omega)}=\frac{E_{{\rm nf},n}(\omega)}{E_{{\rm nf},n}^{\rm ref}(\omega)}$

Near-field contrast spectra are generally complex-valued, reflecting on the possible phase delay of the sample-scattered field with respect to the reference. Near-field contrast spectra depend nearly exclusively on the dielectric properties of sample material and can be used for its identification and characterization.

=== Nano-FTIR absorption spectroscopy ===
For the purpose of describing near-field contrasts for optically thin samples composed of polymers, organics, biological matter and other soft matter (so called weak oscillators), the near-field signal to a good approximation can be expressed as:

$\eta_n\propto \beta(\omega)$,

where $\beta=(\epsilon-1)/(\epsilon+1)$ is the surface response function that depends on the complex-valued dielectric function $\epsilon(\omega)$ of the sample and can be also viewed as the reflection coefficient for evanescent waves that constitute the near field of the tip. That is, the spectral dependence of $\eta_n(\omega)$ is determined exclusively by the sample reflection coefficient. The latter is purely real and acquires an imaginary part only in narrow spectral regions around the sample absorption lines. This means that the spectrum of an imaginary part of the near-field contrast resembles the conventional FTIR absorbance spectrum, $A(\omega)$, of the sample material:${\rm Im}[\sigma(\omega)]\propto A(\omega)$. It is therefore convenient to define the nano-FTIR absorption $a={\rm Im}(\eta_n)=s_n \sin(\phi_n)$, which directly relates to the sample absorbance spectrum:

$a(\omega)\propto A(\omega)$

It can be used for direct sample identification and characterization according to the standard FTIR databases without the need of modeling the tip-sample interaction.

For phononic and plasmonic samples in the vicinity of the corresponding surface surface resonances, the relation $\eta_n(\omega)=\beta(\omega)$ might not hold. In such cases the simple relation between $a(\omega)$ and $A(\omega)$ can not be obtained, requiring modeling of the tip-sample interaction for spectroscopic identification of such samples.

=== Analytical and numerical simulations ===
Significant efforts have been put towards simulating nano-FTIR electric field and complex scattering signal through numerical methods (using commercial proprietary software such as CST Microwave Studio, Lumerical FDTD, and COMSOL Multiphysics) as well as through analytical models (such as through finite dipole and point dipole approximations). Analytical simulations tend to be more simplified and inaccurate, while numerical methods are more rigorous but computationally expensive.
