= Infrared Nanospectroscopy (AFM-IR) =

Infrared microscopy technique

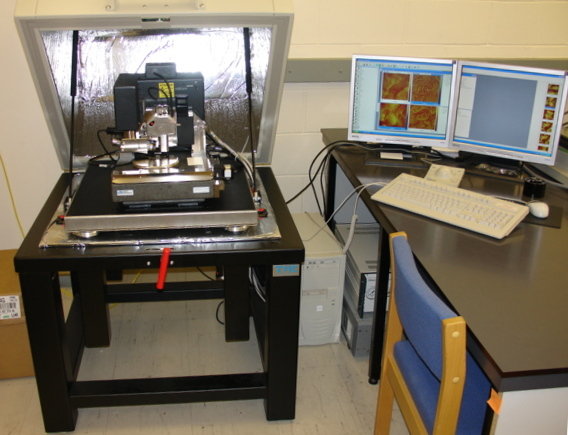
An atomic-force microscope with its controlling computer

AFM-IR (atomic force microscope-infrared spectroscopy) or infrared nanospectroscopy is one of a family of techniques that are derived from a combination of two parent instrumental techniques. AFM-IR combines the chemical analysis power of infrared spectroscopy and the high-spatial resolution of scanning probe microscopy (SPM). The term was first used to denote a method that combined a tuneable free electron laser with an atomic force microscope (AFM, a type of SPM) equipped with a sharp probe that measured the local absorption of infrared light by a sample with nanoscale spatial resolution.

Originally the technique required the sample to be deposited on an infrared-transparent prism and be less than 1μm thick. This early setup improved the spatial resolution and sensitivity of photothermal AFM-based techniques from microns to circa 100 nm. Then, the use of modern pulsed optical parametric oscillators and quantum cascade lasers, in combination with top-illumination, have enabled to investigate samples on any substrate and with increase sensitivity and spatial resolution. As most recent advances, AFM-IR has been proved capable to acquire chemical maps and nanoscale resolved spectra at the single-molecule scale from macromolecular self-assemblies and biomolecules with circa 10 nm diameter, as well as to overcome limitations of IR spectroscopy and measure in aqueous liquid environments.

Recording the amount of infrared absorption as a function of wavelength or wavenumber, AFM-IR creates an infrared absorption spectra that can be used to chemically characterize and even identify unknown samples. Recording the infrared absorption as a function of position can be used to create chemical composition maps that show the spatial distribution of different chemical components. Novel extensions of the original AFM-IR technique and earlier techniques have enabled the development of bench-top devices capable of nanometer spatial resolution, that do not require a prism and can work with thicker samples, and thereby greatly improving ease of use and expanding the range of samples that can be analysed. AFM-IR has achieved lateral spatial resolutions of ca. 10 nm, with a sensitivity down to the scale of molecular monolayer and single protein molecules with molecular weight down to 400-600 kDa.

AFM-IR is related to techniques such as tip-enhanced Raman spectroscopy (TERS), scanning near-field optical microscopy (SNOM), nano-FTIR and other methods of vibrational analysis with scanning probe microscopy.

== History ==
=== Early history ===
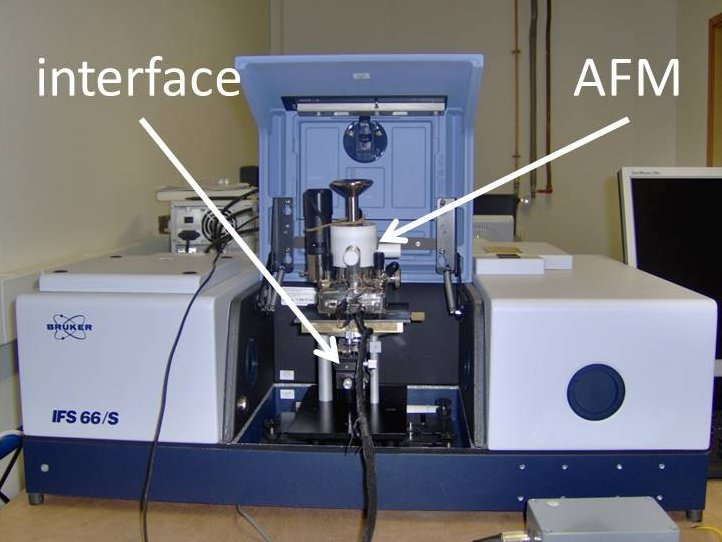
Atomic force microscope inside a FTIR spectrometer with the optical interface

The earliest measurements combining AFM with infrared spectroscopy were performed in 1999 by Hammiche et al. at the University of Lancaster in the United Kingdom, in an EPSRC-funded project led by M Reading and H M Pollock. Separately, Anderson at the Jet Propulsion Laboratory in the United States made a related measurement in 2000. Both groups used a conventional Fourier transform infrared spectrometer (FTIR) equipped with a broadband thermal source, the radiation was focused near the tip of a probe that was in contact with a sample. The Lancaster group obtained spectra by detecting the absorption of infrared radiation using a temperature sensitive thermal probe. Anderson took the different approach of using a conventional AFM probe to detect the thermal expansion. He reported an interferogram but not a spectrum; the first infrared spectrum obtained in this way was reported by Hammiche et al. in 2004: this represented the first proof that spectral information about a sample could be obtained using this approach.

Both of these early experiments used a broadband source in conjunction with an interferometer; these techniques could, therefore, be referred to as AFM-FTIR although Hammiche et al. coined the more general term photothermal microspectroscopy or PTMS in their first paper. PTMS has various subgroups; including techniques that measure temperature measure thermal expansion use broadband sources. use lasers excite the sample using evanescent waves, illuminate the sample directly from above etc. and different combinations of these. Fundamentally, they all exploit the photothermal effect. Different combinations of sources, methods, methods of detection and methods of illumination have benefits for different applications. Care should be taken to ensure that it is clear which form of PTMS is being used in each case. Currently there is no universally accepted nomenclature. The original technique dubbed AFM-IR that induced resonant motion in the probe using a Free Electron Laser has developed by exploiting the foregoing permutations so that it has evolved into various forms.

The pioneering experiments of Hammiche et al and Anderson had limited spatial resolution due to thermal diffusion - the spreading of heat away from the region where the infrared light was absorbed. The thermal diffusion length (the distance the heat spreads) is inversely proportional to the root of the modulation frequency. Consequently, the spatial resolution achieved by the early AFM-IR approaches was around one micron or more, due to the low modulation frequencies of the incident radiation created by the movement of the mirror in the interferometer. Also, the first thermal probes were Wollaston wire devices that were developed originally for Microthermal analysis (in fact PTMS was originally considered to be one of a family of microthermal techniques). The comparatively large size of these probes also limited spatial resolution. Bozec et al. and Reading et al. used thermal probes with nanoscale dimensions and demonstrated higher spatial resolution. Ye et al described a MEM-type thermal probe giving sub-100 nm spatial resolution, which they used for nanothermal analysis. The process of exploring laser sources began in 2001 by Hammiche et al when they acquired the first spectrum using a tuneable laser (see Resolution improvement with pulsed laser source).

A significant development was the creation by Reading et al. in 2001 of a custom interface that allowed measurements to be made while illuminating the sample from above; this interface focused the infrared beam to a spot of circa 500μm diameter, close to the theoretical maximum (Note: Graham Poulter, Research Director for Specac Instruments, "The energy available in an optical instrument is directly related the product of the area A of any point in the optical system, multiplied by the solid angle Ω filled by the beam at that point. This product, AΩ, is known as the étendue (also referred to as the "throughput" or "luminosity") and remains a constant at all points in the system. When focusing a beam down from say a 5mm diameter spot in a typical FTIR to a 0.5mm diameter spot, the area A is decreased by a factor of 100 and, therefore, the solid angle Ω has to be increased by the same factor. When illuminating something on a flat surface from one side there is a physical limitation that means Ω cannot exceed π steradians (it's illuminated from a complete hemisphere). Depending on the solid angle in the original instrument beam, this immediately puts a working limit on the minimum spot size that can be usefully obtained when focusing the beam down". Poulter designed the optics in the interface described by Reading et al.). The use of top-down or top-side illumination has the important benefit that samples of arbitrary thickness can be studied on arbitrary substrates. In many cases this can be done without any sample preparation. All subsequent experiments by Hammiche, Pollock, Reading and their co-workers were made using this type of interface including the instrument constructed by Hill et al. for nanoscale imaging using a pulsed laser. The work of the University of Lancaster group in collaboration with workers from the University of East Anglia led to the formation of a company, Anasys Instruments, to exploit this and related technologies (see Commercialization).

=== Spatial resolution improvement with pulsed laser sources ===
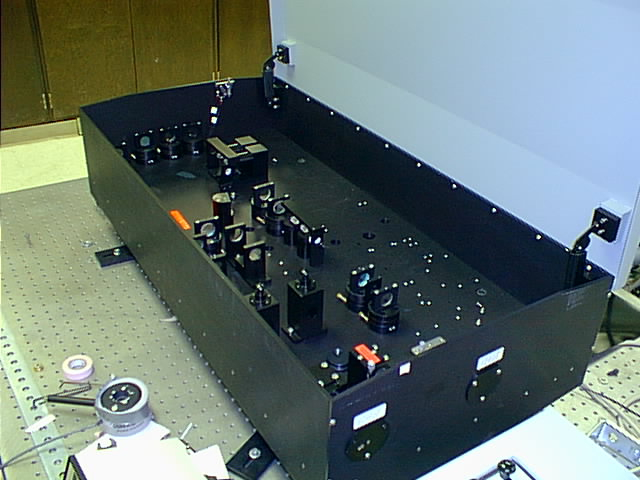
An infrared optical parametric oscillator (OPO), 1997

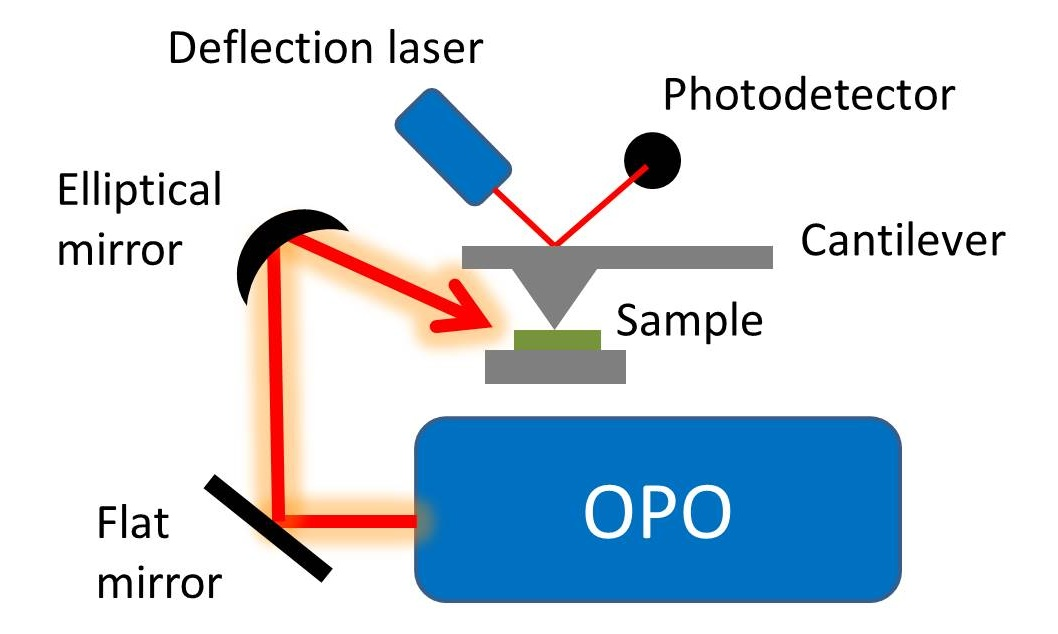
Schematic of the AFM-IR instrument using an OPO light source constructed at the University of East Anglia by Hill et al in 2007

In the first paper on AFM-based infrared by Hammiche et al., the relevant well-established theoretical considerations were outlined that predict that high spatial resolution can be achieved using rapid modulation frequencies because of the consequent reduction in the thermal diffusion length. They estimated that spatial resolutions in the range of 20 nm-30 nm should be achievable. The most readily available sources that can achieve high modulation frequencies are pulsed lasers: even when the rapidity of the pulses is not high, the square wave form of a pulse contains very high modulation frequencies in Fourier space. In 2001, Hammiche et al. used a type of bench-top tuneable, pulsed infrared laser known as an optical parametric oscillator or OPO and obtained the first probe-based infrared spectrum with a pulsed laser, however, they did not report any images.

Nanoscale spatial resolution AFM-IR imaging using a pulsed laser was first demonstrated by Dazzi et al at the University of Paris-Sud, France. Dazzi and his colleagues used a wavelength-tuneable, free electron laser at the CLIO facility (Note: Centre Laser Infrarouge d'Orsay, Orsay Infrared Laser Centre) in Orsay, France to provide an infrared source with short pulses. Like earlier workers, they used a conventional AFM probe to measure thermal expansion but introduced a novel optical configuration: the sample was mounted on an IR-transparent prism so that it could be excited by an evanescent wave. Absorption of short infrared laser pulses by the sample caused rapid thermal expansion that created a force impulse at the tip of the AFM cantilever. The thermal expansion pulse induced transient resonant oscillations of the AFM cantilever probe. This has led to the technique being dubbed Photo-Thermal Induced Resonance (PTIR), by some workers in the field. Some prefer the terms PTIR or PTMS to AFM-IR as the technique is not necessarily restricted to infrared wavelengths. The amplitude of the cantilever oscillation is directly related to the amount of infrared radiation absorbed by the sample. By measuring the cantilever oscillation amplitude as a function of wavenumber, Dazzi's group was able to obtain absorption spectra from nanoscale regions of the sample. Compared to earlier work, this approach improved spatial resolution because the use of short laser pulses reduced the duration of the thermal expansion pulse to the point that the thermal diffusion lengths can be on the scale of nanometres rather than microns.

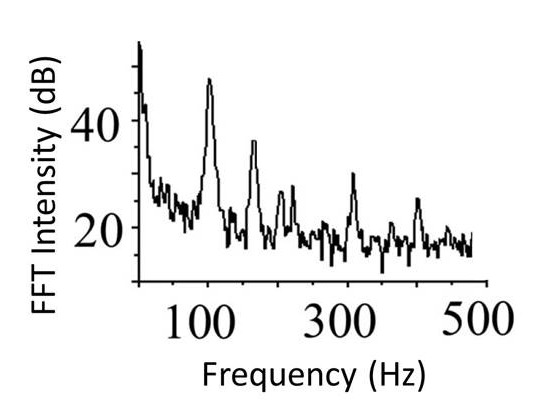
Fast Fourier Transform of cantilever vibrations after a laser pulse; the height of a characteristic peak measures the amount of infrared light absorbed by the sample

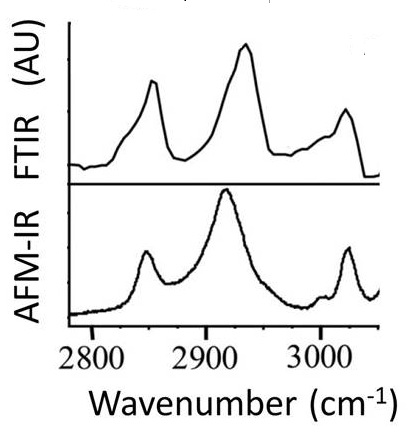
Spectrum obtained from the AFM measurement by changing the laser wavelength (below); it has good agreement with a conventional FTIR spectrum (above)

A key advantage of the use of a tuneable laser source, with a narrow wavelength range, is the ability to rapidly map the locations of specific chemical components on the sample surface. To achieve this, Dazzi's group tuned their free electron laser source to a wavelength corresponding to the molecular vibration of the chemical of interest, then mapped the cantilever oscillation amplitude as function of position across the sample. They demonstrated the ability to map chemical composition in E. coli bacteria. They could also visualize polyhydroxybutyrate (PHB) vesicles inside Rhodobacter capsulatus cells and monitor the efficiency of PHB production by the cells.

At the University of East Anglia in the UK, as part of an EPSRC-funded project led by M. Reading and S. Meech, Hill and his co-workers followed the earlier work of Reading et al. and Hammiche et al. and measured thermal expansion using an optical configuration that illuminated the sample from above in contrast to Dazzi et al. who excited the sample with an evanescent wave from below. Hill also made use of an optical parametric oscillator as the infrared source in the manner of Hammiche et al. This novel combination of topside illumination, OPO source and measuring thermal expansion proved capable of nanoscale spatial resolution for infrared imaging and spectroscopy (the figures show a schematic of the UEA apparatus and results obtained with it). The use by Hill and co-workers of illumination from above allowed a substantially wider range of samples to be studied than was possible using Dazzi's technique. By introducing the use of a bench top IR source and topdown illumination, the work of Hammiche, Hill and their coworkers made possible the first commercially viable SPM-based infrared instrument (see Commercialization).

=== Broadband pulsed laser sources ===
Reading et al. have explored the use of a broadband QCL combined with thermal expansion measurements. Above, the inability of thermal broadband sources to achieve high spatial resolution is discussed (see history). In this case the frequency of modulation is limited by the mirror speed of the interferometer which, in turn, limits the lateral spatial resolution that can be achieved. When using a broadband QCL the resolution is limited not by the mirror speed but by the modulation frequency of the laser pulses (or other waveforms). The benefit of using a broadband source is that an image can be acquired that comprises an entire spectrum or part of a spectrum for each pixel. This is much more powerful than acquiring images bases on a single wavelength. The preliminary results of Reading et al. show that directing a broadband QCL though an interferometer can give an easily detectable response from a conventional AFM probe measuring thermal expansion.

=== Commercialization ===
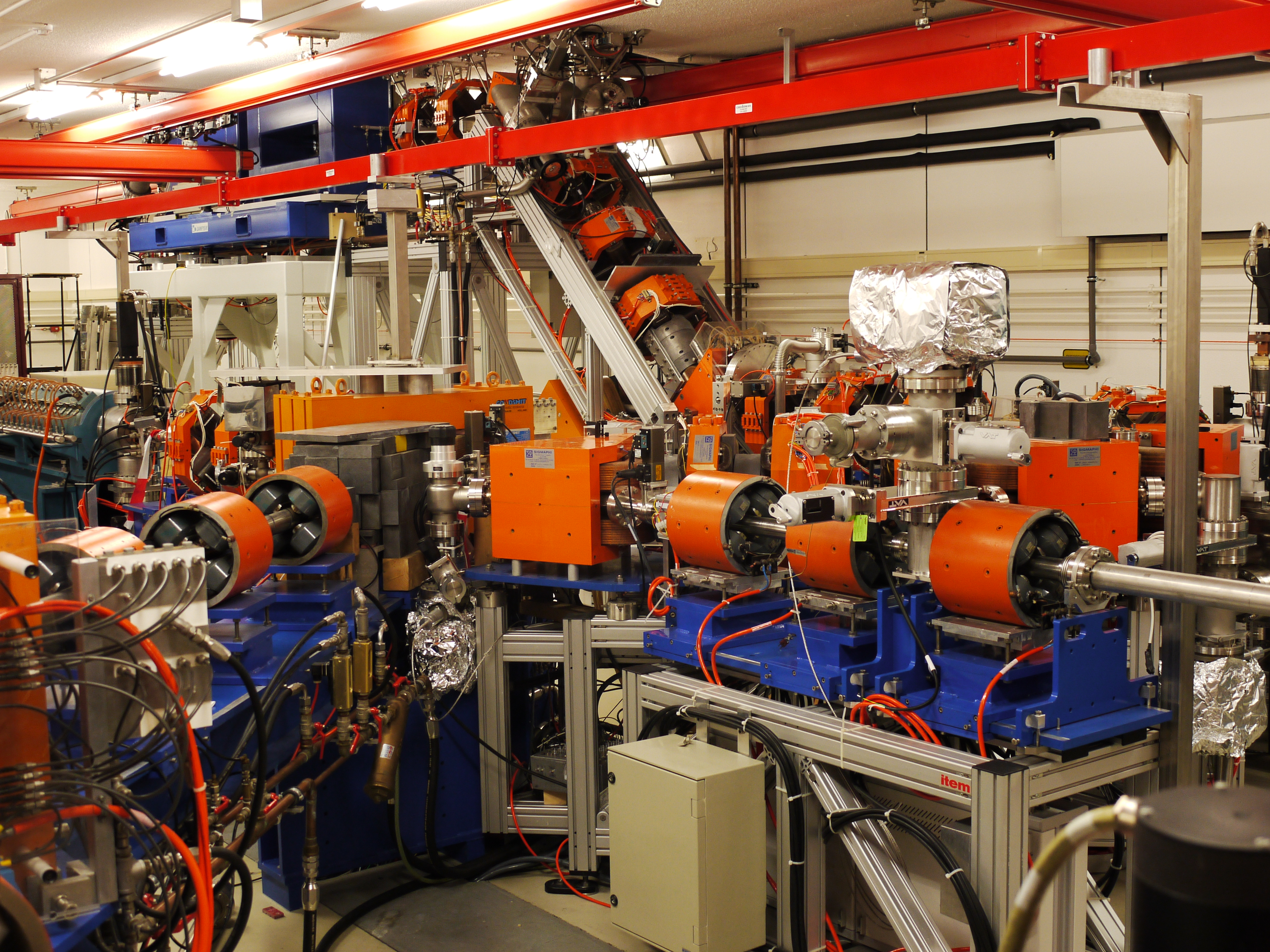
The free-electron laser FELIX at the FOM Institute for Plasma Physics Rijnhuizen Nieuwegein, The Netherlands (2010); a large and uncommon piece of equipment

The AFM-IR technique based on a pulsed infrared laser source was commercialized by Anasys Instruments, a company founded by Reading, Hammiche and Pollock in the United Kingdom in 2004; a sister, United States corporation was founded a year later. Anasys Instruments developed its product with support from the National Institute of Standards and Technology and the National Science Foundation. Since free electron lasers are rare and available only at select institutions, a key to enabling a commercial AFM-IR was to replace them with a more compact type of infrared source. Following the lead given by Hammiche et al in 2001 and Hill et al in 2008, Anasys Instruments introduced an AFM-IR product in early 2010, using a tabletop laser source based on a nanosecond optical parametric oscillator. The OPO source enabled nanoscale infrared spectroscopy over a tuning range of roughly 1000–4000 cm^{−1} or 2.5-10 μm.

The initial product required samples to be mounted on infrared-transparent prisms, with the infrared light being directed from below in the manner of Dazzi et al. (Note: An arrangement is similar to attenuated total reflectance (ATR) schemes used in conventional infrared spectroscopy) For best operation, this illumination scheme required thin samples, with optimal thickness of less than 1 μm, prepared on the surface of the prism. In 2013, Anasys released an AFM-IR instrument based on the work of Hill et al. that supported top-side illumination. "By eliminating the need to prepare samples on infrared-transparent prisms and relaxing the restriction on sample thickness, the range of samples that could be studied was greatly expanded. The CEO of Anasys Instruments recognised this achievement by calling it " an exciting major advance" in a letter written to the university and included in the final report of EPSRC project EP/C007751/1. The UEA technique went on to become Anasys Instruments' flagship product.

=== Comparison to related photothermal techniques ===
It is worth noting that the first infrared spectrum obtained by measuring thermal expansion using an AFM was obtained by Hammiche and co-workers without inducing resonant motions in the probe cantilever. In this early example the modulation frequency was too low to achieve high spatial resolution but there is nothing, in principle, preventing the measurement of thermal expansion at higher frequencies without analysing or inducing resonant behaviour. Possible options for measuring the displacement of the tip rather than the subsequent propagation of waves along the cantilever include; interferometry focused at the end of the cantilever where the tip is located, a torsional motion resulting from an offset probe (it would only be influenced by the motions of the cantilever as a second order effect) and exploiting the fact that the signal from a heated thermal probe is strongly influenced by the position of the tip relative to the surface thus this could provide a measurement of thermal expansion that wasn't strongly influenced by or dependent upon resonance. The advantages of a non-resonant method of detection is that any frequency of light modulation could be used thus depth information could be obtained in a controlled way (see below) whereas methods that rely on resonance are limited to harmonics. The thermal-probe based method of Hammiche et al. has found a significant number of applications.

A unique application made possible by the top-down illumination combined with a thermal probe is localized depth profiling, this is not possible using either using the Dazzi et al. configuration of AFM-IR or that of Hill et al. despite the fact the latter uses top-down illumination. Obtaining linescans and images with thermal probes has been shown to be possible, sub-diffraction limit spatial resolution can be achieved and the resolution for delineating boundaries can be enhanced using chemometric techniques.

In all of these examples a spectrum is acquired that spans the entire mid-IR range for each pixel, this is considerably more powerful than measuring the absorption of a single wavelength as is the case for AFM-IR when using either the method of Dazzi et al. or Hill et al. Reading and his group demonstrated how, because thermal probes can be heated, localized thermal analysis can be combined with photothermal infrared spectroscopy using a single probe. In this way local chemical information could be complemented with local physical properties such melting and glass transition temperatures. This in turn led to the concept of thermally assisted nanosampling, where the heated tip performs a local thermal analysis experiment then the probe is retracted taking with it down to femtograms (Note: One femtogram is 10^{−15} grammes) of softened material that adhere to the tip. This material can then be manipulated and/or analysed by photothermal infrared spectroscopy or other techniques. This considerably increases the analytical power of this type of SPM-based infrared instrument beyond anything that can be achieved with conventional AFM probes such as those used in AFM-IR when using either the Dazzi et al. or the Hill et al. version.

Thermal probe techniques have still not achieved the nanoscale spatial resolution that thermal expansion methods have attained though this is theoretically possible. For this, a robust thermal probe and a high intensity source is needed. Recently, the first images using a QCL and a thermal probe have been obtained by Reading et al. A good signal to noise ratio enabled rapid imaging but sub-micron spatial resolution was not clearly demonstrated. Theory predicts improvements in spatial resolution could be achieved by confining data analysis to the early part of the thermal response to a step change increase in the intensity of the incident radiation. In this way pollution of the measurement from adjacent regions would be avoided, i.e. the measurement window could be confined to a suitable fraction of the time of flight of the thermal wave (using a Fourier analysis of the response could provide a similar outcome by using the high frequency components). This could be achieved by tapping the probe in synchrony with the laser. Similarly, lasers that provide very rapid modulations could further reduce thermal diffusion lengths.

Although most effort to date has been focused on thermal expansion measurements, this might change. Truly robust thermal probes have recently become available, as have affordable compact QCL's that are tuneable over a broad frequency range. Consequently, it may soon be the case that thermal probe techniques will become as widely used as those based on thermal expansion. Ultimately, instruments that can easily switch between modes and even combine them using a single probe will certainly become available, for example, a single probe will eventually be able to measure both temperature and thermal expansion.

== Recent improvements and single-molecule sensitivity ==
The original commercial AFM-IR instruments required most samples to be thicker than 50 nm to achieve sufficient sensitivity. Sensitivity improvements were achieved using specialized cantilever probes with an internal resonator and by wavelet based signal processing techniques. Sensitivity was further improved by Lu et al. by using quantum cascade laser (QCL) sources. The high repetition rate of the QCL allows absorbed infrared light to continuously excite the AFM tip at a "contact resonance" (Note: A contact resonance is a vibrational resonance frequency of an AFM cantilever that occurs when the tip of the AFM is in contact with a sample surface. When the QCL is pulsed synchronously with a contact resonance, the detection of the thermal expansion of the sample from infrared absorption is amplified by the quality factor Q of the contact resonance.) of the AFM cantilever. This resonance-enhanced AFM-IR, in combination with electric field enhancement from metallic tips and substrates led to the demonstration of AFM-IR spectroscopy and compositional imaging of films as thin as single self-assembled monolayers. AFM-IR has also been integrated with other sources including a picosecond OPO offering a tuning range 1.55 μm to 16 μm (from 6450 cm^{−1} to 625 cm^{−1}).

In its initial development, with samples deposited on transparent prisms and using OPO laser sources, the sensitivity of AFM-IR was limited to a minimal thickness of the sample of circa 50-100 nm as mentioned above. The advent of quantum cascade lasers (QCL) and the use of the electromagnetic field enhancement between metallic probes and substrates have improved the sensitivity and spatial resolution of AFM-IR down to the measurement of large (>0.3 μm) and flat (~2–10 nm) self-assembled monolayers, where still hundreds of molecules are present. Ruggeri et al. have recently developed off-resonance, low power and short pulse AFM-IR (ORS-nanoIR) to prove the acquisition of infrared absorption spectra and chemical maps at the single molecule level, in the case of macromolecular assemblies and large protein molecules with a spatial resolution of ca. 10 nm.

== Nanoscale chemical imaging and mapping ==
=== Nanoscale resolved chemical maps and spectra ===
AFM-IR enables nanoscale infrared spectroscopy, i.e. the ability to obtain infrared absorption spectra from nanoscale regions of a sample.

Chemical compositional mapping AFM-IR can also be used to perform chemical imaging or compositional mapping with spatial resolution down to ~10-20 nm, limited only by the radius of the AFM tip. In this case, the tuneable infrared source emits a single wavelength, corresponding to a specific molecular resonance, i.e. a specific infrared absorption band. By mapping the AFM cantilever oscillation amplitude as a function of position, it is possible to map out the distribution of specific chemical components. Compositional maps can be made at different absorption bands to reveal the distribution of difference chemical species.

Examples of AFM-IR Nanospectroscopy
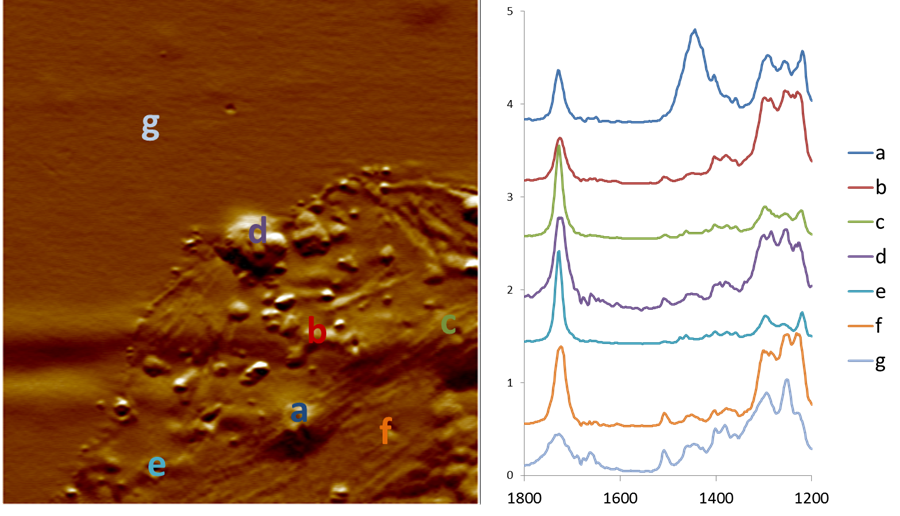
AFM-IR nanospectroscopy of a laser printer toner particle, showing spatially resolved chemical analysis. Toner particles are typically complex composites of various binders and transfer agents; these can be revealed by AFM-IR

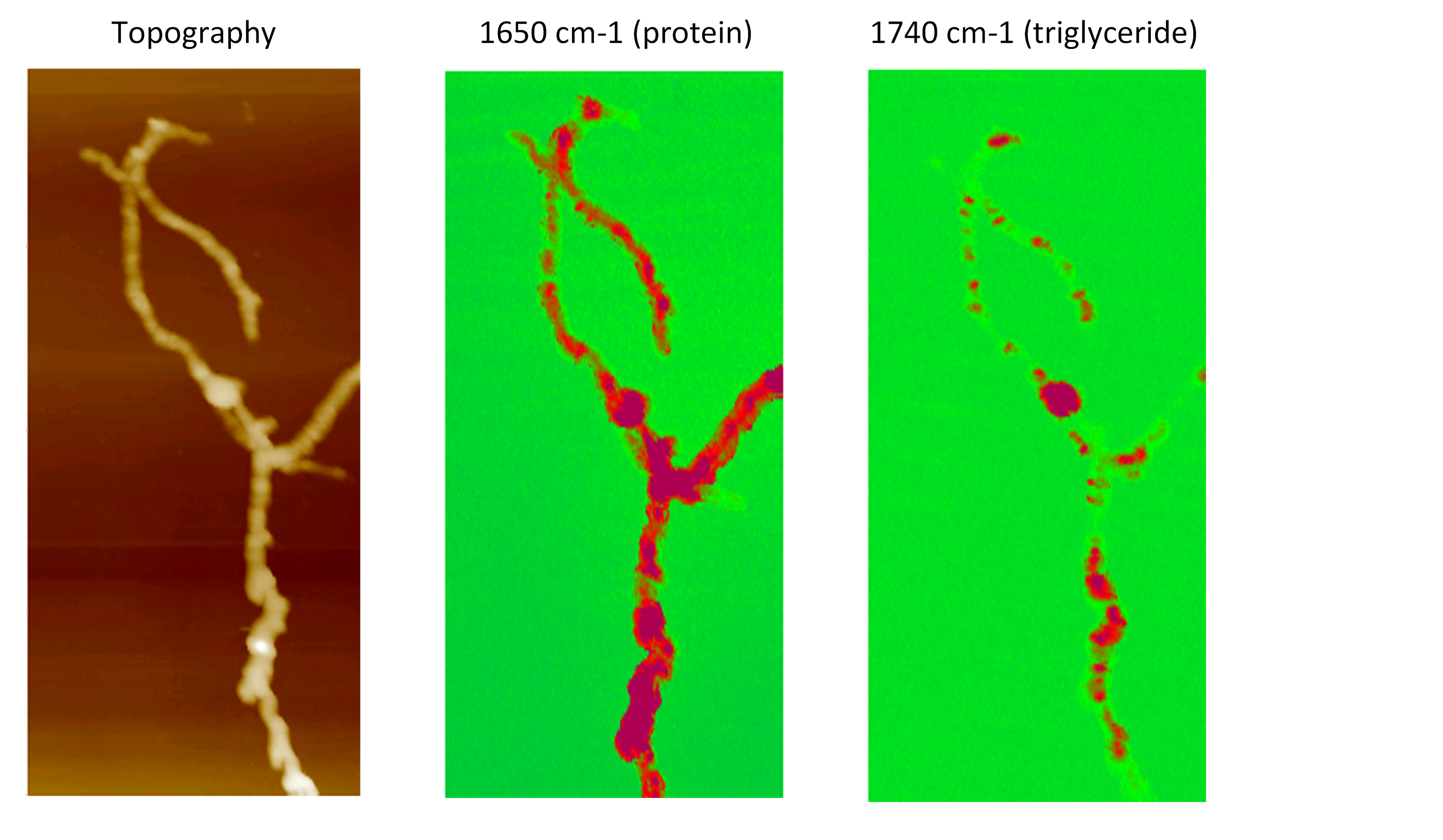
AFM-IR compositional mapping of Streptomyces bacteria. Left: AFM topographic image of bacterial cells. Middle: AFM-IR absorption at 1650 cm^{−1}, corresponding to the amide I band associated with protein. Right: AFM-IR absorption at the carbonyl band 1740 cm^{−1}, indicating the distribution of triglyceride vesicles within bacterial cells.

=== Complementary morphological and mechanical mapping ===
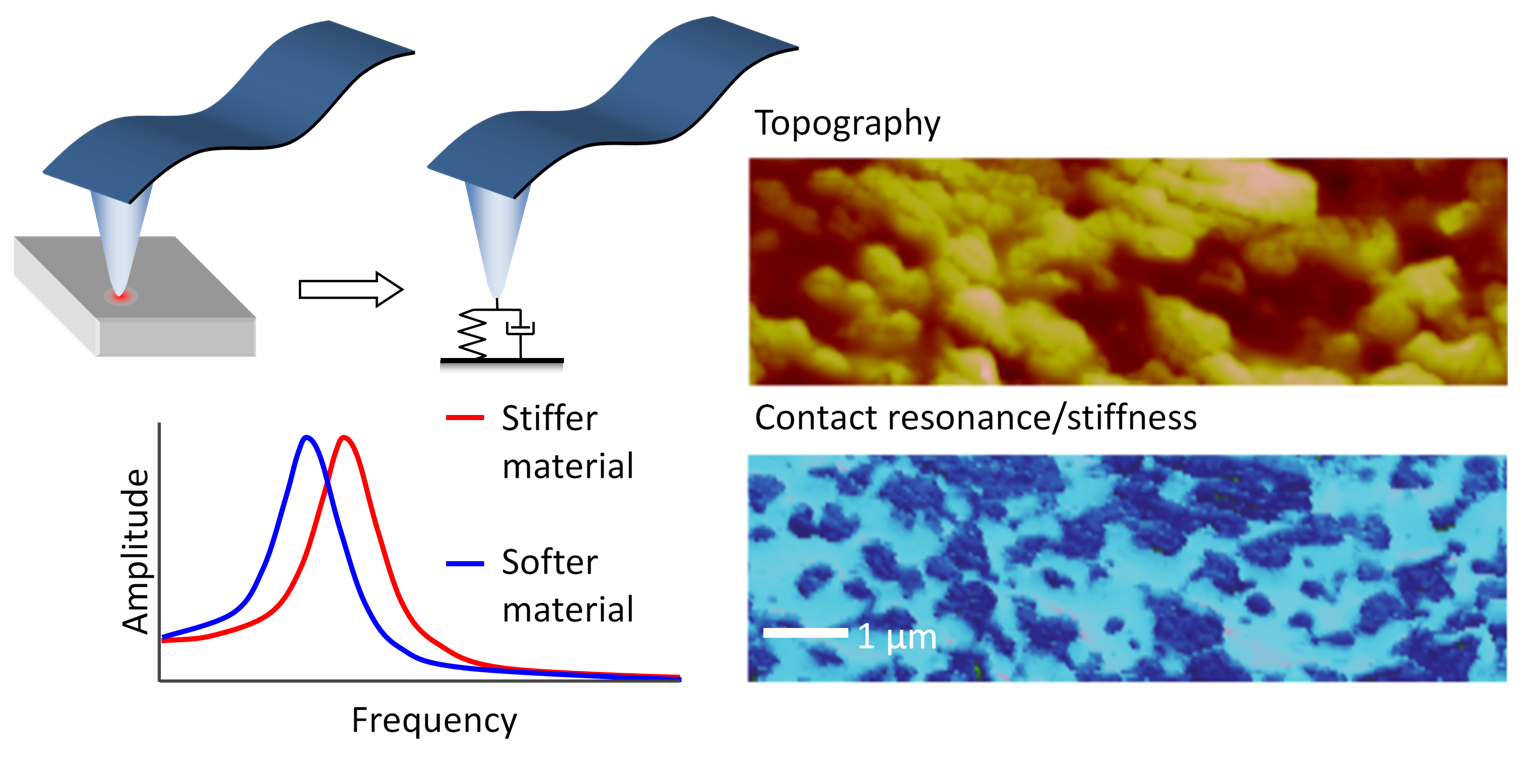
Complementary elasticity mapping via simultaneous contact resonance measurements.

The AFM-IR technique can simultaneously provide complementary measurements of the mechanical stiffness and dissipation of a sample surface. When infrared light is absorbed by the sample the resulting rapid thermal expansion excites a "contact resonance" of the AFM cantilever, i.e. a coupled resonance resulting from the properties of both the cantilever and the stiffness and damping of the sample surface. Specifically, the resonance frequency shifts to higher frequencies for stiffer materials and to lower frequencies for softer material. Additionally, the resonance becomes broader for materials with larger dissipation. These contact resonances have been studied extensively by the AFM community (see, for example, atomic force acoustic microscopy). Traditional contact resonance AFM requires an external actuator to excite the cantilever contact resonances. In AFM-IR these contact resonances are automatically excited every time an infrared pulse is absorbed by the sample. So the AFM-IR technique can measure the infrared absorption by the amplitude of the cantilever oscillation response and the mechanical properties of the sample via the contact resonance frequency and quality factor.

== Applications ==
Applications of AFM-IR have include the characterisation of protein, polymers composites, bacteria, cells, biominerals, pharmaceutical sciences, photonics/nanoantennas, fuel cells, fibers, skin, hair, metal organic frameworks, microdroplets, self-assembled monolayers, nanocrystals, and semiconductors.

=== Polymers ===
Polymers blends, composites, multilayer films and fibers AFM-IR has been used to identify and map polymer components in blends, characterize interfaces in composites, and even reverse engineer multilayer films Additionally AFM-IR has been used to study chemical composition in Poly(3][4-ethylenedioxythiophene) (PEDOT) conducting polymers. and vapor infiltration into polyethylene terephthalate PET fibers.

=== Protein science ===
The chemical and structural properties of protein determine their interactions, and thus their functions, in a wide variety of biochemical processes. Since Ruggeri et al. pioneering work on the aggregation pathways of the Josephin domain of ataxin-3, responsible for type-3 spinocerebellar ataxia, an inheritable protein-misfolding disease, AFM-IR was used to characterize molecular conformations in a wide spectrum of applications in protein and life sciences. This approach has delivered new mechanistic insights into the behaviour of disease-related proteins and peptides, such as Aβ42, huntingtin and FUS, which are involved in the onset of Alzheimer's, Huntington's and Amyotrophic lateral sclerosis (ALS). Similarly AFM-IR has been applied to study studying protein based functional biomaterials.

=== Life sciences ===
AFM-IR has been used to characterise spectroscopically in detail chromosomes, bacteria and cells with nanoscale resolution. For example, in the case of infection of bacteria by viruses (Bacteriophages), and also the production of polyhydroxybutyrate (PHB) vesicles inside Rhodobacter capsulatus cells and triglycerides in Streptomyces bacteria (for biofuel applications). AFM-IR has also been used to evaluate and map mineral conteacnt, crystallinity, collagen maturity and acid phosphate content via ratiometric analysis of various absorption bands in bone. AFM-IR has also been used to perform spectroscopy and chemical mapping of structural lipids in human skin, cells and hair

=== Fuel cells ===
AFM-IR has been used to study hydrated Nafion membranes used as separators in fuel cells. The measurements revealed the distribution of free and ionically bound water on the Nafion surface.

=== Photonic nanoantennas ===
AFM-IR has been used to study the surface plasmon resonance in heavily silicon-doped indium arsenide microparticles. Gold split ring resonators have been studied for use with Surfe-Enhanced Infrared Absorption Spectroscopy. In this case AFM-IR was used to measure the local field enhancement of the plasmonics structures (~30X) at 100 nm spatial resolution.

=== Pharmaceutical sciences ===
AFM-IR has been used to study miscibility and phase separation in drug polymer blends, the chemical analysis of nanocrystalline drug particles as small 90 nm across, the interaction of chromosomes with chemotherapeutics drugs, and of amyloids with pharmacological approaches to contrast neurodegeneration.
