= Microthermal analysis =

Materials characterization technique

Microthermal analysis is a materials characterization technique which combines the thermal analysis principles of differential scanning calorimetry (DSC) with the high spatial resolution of scanning probe microscopy. The instrument consists of a thermal probe, a fine platinum/rhodium alloy wire (5 micro meter in diameter) coated by a sheath of silver (Wollaston wire). The wire is bent into a V-shape, and the silver sheath is etched away to form a fine-pointed tip. The probe acts as both the heater as well as a temperature sensor. The probe is attached to a conventional scanning probe microscope and can be scanned over the sample surface to resolve the thermal behavior of the sample spatially.

This technique has been widely used for localized thermal analysis, where the probe is heated rapidly to avoid thermal diffusion through the sample and the response of the substance in immediate proximity to the tip is measured as a function of temperature. Micro-thermal analysis was launched commercially in March 1998.

Microthermal analysis has been extended to higher spatial resolution to nanothermal analysis, which uses microfabricated self-heating silicon cantilevers to probe thermomechanical properties of materials with sub-100 nm spatial resolution.
